The Thracian religion refers to the mythology, ritual practices and beliefs of the Thracians, a collection of closely related ancient Indo-European peoples who inhabited eastern and southeastern Europe and northwestern Anatolia throughout antiquity and who included the Thracians proper, the Getae, the Dacians, and the Bithynians. The Thracians themselves did not leave an extensive written corpus of their mythology and rituals, but information about their beliefs is nevertheless available through epigraphic and iconographic sources, as well as through ancient Greek writings.

Origin
The Thracian religion, and especially its creation myth and its pantheon, were derived from the Proto-Indo-European religion.

The Thracian conceptualisation of the world, which held that it was composed of the four elements (Air, Earth, Fire, Water), is attested from the early Bronze Age, around the fourth millennium BCE, and was recorded in poems and hymns originally composed in the late Bronze Age during the 2nd millennium BC which were later passed down orally. By the end of the Bronze Age, the cult of the Sun was prevalent throughout Thrace. Daily use objects and art were decorated with symbols of the Sun, and the representations of the Sun were carved into cliffs and in the rocks of the eastern Rhodope Mountains.

The late Bronze Age was also a period during which there were considerable cultural contacts between Thrace, northern Greece and Asia Minor. This cultural contact led to significant religious exchanges, such as the importation of the belief in the Great Mother Goddess in Thrace. Accompanying the spread of the belief in the Great Mother Goddess to Thrace was the evolution of the concept of the divinisation of the mountain in the later 2nd millennium BC and the early 1st millennium BC, which was itself contemporaneous with the flourishing of megalithic culture in Thrace. Remains of this megalithic culture include many monuments, such as rock-cut niches of rectangular or circular of trapezoidal shape for votive gifts, platforms for sacrifices which include troughs and drainage outlets for the victims' blood, sacred steps to springs or rock sanctuaries, complexes of megalithic structures, and dolmens. During the late Bronze Age and the early Iron Age, the cult of the chthonic deity Zagreus (Dionysus) also spread across the Hellespont from Anatolia into Thrace during a period of social crisis in the Balkans peninsula, and from there it spread into Greece. Although the cult of Zagreus was initially opposed by the practitioners of the local solar cults, it ultimately prevailed and became entrenched in Thrace, after which it merged with the solar cult and the Sun and chthonic deities merged into a single deity within the Thracian pantheon.

The Thracians were culturally closer to the Iranian Scythians to the north of the Danube river and the peoples of Asia Minor and the Achaemenid Persians to the east of the Hellespont than to their Greek neighbours in the south.

Cosmology

The Thracians, like the other ancient peoples of south-east Europe, believed universal forces worked within the world, which was itself made from the four classical elements, namely the Earth, Air, Water and Fire. These four elements were conceived of as forces or energies which were combined in the form of the mountain, which was personified as the Thracian Great Mother Goddess. Therefore, the tetrad was seen as the basis of the cosmos in Thracian religion, and the number ten was seen as representing the Cosmos since it was itself composed of the numbers four, three, two, and one, according to the equation .

A symbolic representation of the Thracian cosmology in Thracian art is the image of a horned eagle holding a hare in its talons and a fish in its beak: the eagle represents the element of the Air and the "above," the hare represents the Earth and the "middle," and the fish represents Water and the "below".

Pantheon
According to the ancient Greek historian, Herodotus of Halicarnassus, the Thracians worshipped only three gods, whom he identified via interpretatio graeca with the Greek deities Artemis, Dionysus, and Ares, who respectively held the positions of the Mother of Gods, the Father deity, and the Son of the previous two. This triad recorded by Herodotus might have reflected the tripartite division of Indo-European societies into the priestly, military and economic categories. Thus, "Ares" represented the warrior function, "Dionysus" was connected to the clergy, and "Artemis" in her form as the Great Goddess was the female "transfunctional" deity who was the patron of reproduction in both nature and human society.

However, the Thracologist Ivan Marazov has criticised this supposed Thracian divine triad as an artificial construction by Herodotus to make the Thracian deities more comprehensible to his Greek audience, and has pointed out that more Thracian deities are mentioned by Herodotus himself and are also attested archaeologically. Instead, only two major deities are attested in the Thracian pantheon, the Great Goddess  and the Hero God , while Orpheus/ was a demigod.

Every Thracian deity was assigned the attributes of a mounted hunter.

As with most peoples of Antiquity, the kingdom of the gods in Thracian religion was patterned after the human kingdoms, and the order prevailing in the divine realm was considered as the ideal model for earthly society. This realm was not seen as fully separate from the human world, however, as attested by the threat of the Scaeii's and the Cebrenii's king-priest Cosingas that he would climb a ladder to heaven to complain to the goddess about them.

The Thracians did not perceive the world in terms of linear time, and therefore conceptualised their religion and myths not as histories of ancient pasts, but as occurring in the present, unlike the religious worldview of their Greek neighbours. In the Thracian religion, there was no difference between the mythical and heroic past and the present, and the heroes were believed to still be performing their valorous deeds in the present on another plane of existence in heaven which was not necessarily separate from the world of the living necessarily in an abrupt way.

The Thracian Great Mother of the Gods, who was the deity equated by Herodotus with the Greek Artemis, was the main figure of Thracian religion along with the great god , and she was known by many names, including:
, derived from the Indo-European root , meaning "to bind".  was the name most commonly used for the Thracian Great Goddess, especially in south-western Thrace, in the valleys of the Strymon, Nestus and Axius rivers, but also among the Bithyni, who were a Thracian tribe settled in Anatolia
Kottyto
Hipta or Hippa
, meaning "rock" or "mountain top"

 was the embodiment of Heaven and Earth, the source of all life, and the ancestress of humankind, and she represented the mountain, which itself personified the four classical elements from which the world was believed to be made of: her womb deep in the caves of the Earth was washed by underground Water springing from it while she rose high in a rocky peak which was hidden by the Air of heaven and lit by the Fire of lightning. As the Great Goddess,  was the female "transfunctional" deity who was the patron of reproduction in both nature and human society, as well as a patron deity of vegetation.

The Mother Goddess, whose cult was likely of Near Eastern origin and whom the Thracians identified with the Phrygian goddess Cybele. The Scaeii and the Cebrenii assimilated  with the Greek goddess Hera and held her as their supreme deity; a cult of "Hera" unconnected to that of Zeus was attested in Thrace, and a temple was dedicated to "Apollo" of Zerynthus and "Hera" on the Reskythian Mountain near the mouth of the Hebrus river; "Hera" was associated with "Apollo" again on one of the rhyta of the Panagyurishte Treasure, where she was depicted seated on a throne (which was a royal prerogative), with Apollo and Artemis standing near her.  was also known as Tereia, and she was worshipped under this name in a mountain near Lampsacus. Under Roman rule,  was identified with the Greek and Roman goddesses Artemis and Diana.

In Thracian mythology,  personified the initial state of the world, which was at rest. The goddess then self-fertilised herself and gave birth to a first son, who represented the male principle.

The name of the Odrysian king Teres I was also derived from another name of the Great Goddess, this time Tereia, a form of the goddess worshipped in a mountain near Lampsacus and whose name was related with that of the nymph Tereine, who in Greek mythology was the goddess of the river-god Strymon.

Since the Thracian king was identified with the Hero , who had united with the Great Goddess  to become king, so did the human king unite with the Mother Goddess to ensure the plentifulness of the country in an act considered indispensable for him to obtain royal power. This union between the king and the Goddess is visible in representations of the Thracian royal investiture, such as the goddess  about to give a rhyton to a horseman towards her on the plate of the Brezovo gold ring, and the goddess walking leftwards and is followed by a horseman holding a rhyton she has just given him on the Rosovets ring, and the hierogamy scene from the Letnitsa Treasure.

The dual goddess
 had a dual aspect: she was a virgin, as well as a matron, which were the archetypal representations of the principal roles of women in archaic societies such as ancient Thrace.

The virgin 
As the virgin goddess,  had a dual nature: she was a huntress, as well as the goddess of the hearth. The virgin , who was a goddess of the wilderness, was always a huntress, which was an unusual occupation for a woman whereby she occupied the realm of wilderness, which was the opposite of the domestic domain.

In this form as a virgin huntress with nets, or also as a spinner,  was the goddess of war and the patron deity of initiations and warriors, and the warrior-huntress, her attributes were two spears, hence her epithet , meaning "having two spears".

The virgin  was also the goddess of the hearth, and therefore presided over the most "feminine" sphere: the hearth-goddess  presided over the centre of things, the home, the proper, the familiar, and wealth. In this role,  possessed the attributes common to the virgin hearth goddess throughout various Indo-European religions: she was bound to the circle of the hearth and never left the home, thus always being a maid but never a wife, and was associated to the snake, and, since the snake was the representation of the "below," therefore to the earth itself. The hearth-goddess also symbolised the continuity of the clan, which, by guaranteeing the legitimacy of the royal line and he continuity of power, was an important part of the Thracian royal customs. These various attributes together made of  the goddess of the "autochthonic principle," that is the concept of a ruler's right to rule the land he inhabited deriving from him originating from that place, and which held a very important place in archaic societies such as in Thrace.

This importance of the hearth-goddess as the embodiment of the "autochthonic principle" is reflected across various Indo-European religions in the emphasis on the hearth-goddess in the rituals through which kings would take over new territory:
according to legend, the Argive Perdiccas I of Macedon used his knife to cut a circle on the floor around the hearth of the king of Lebaea before becoming king of Macedonia
whenever the Macedonian king Philip II conquered or sought to conquer a new country, he would marry its princess, that is he would ritually unite with its local personification of Hestia (the Greek hearth-goddess).

Such a concept of the autochthonous principle also existed in Thrace, as attested by the presence of snake-shaped hearth decorations in ancient Thrace.

The matron 
As a matron,  was the protector goddess of marriage and a mother goddess who appeared as a woman having experienced marriage and motherhood, and therefore was a mother who personified the earth, and the principles of life and creation out of which the autochthonic hero who was fated to be enthroned was born, as well as a peacemaker and nurturer who presented the Hero  with the insignia of power.

When the Bithyni honoured  in Spring, they imagined her as a huge woman spinning thread and nurturing pigs, likely because of the goddess's multi-faceted nature.

 had a chthonic aspect as well, due to which Hesychius of Alexandria compared her to Persephone, and attested by Roman-era reliefs where she wears a crescent Moon on her hair (which identifies her with the Greek Moon-goddess Selene) and holds a twig granting free passage into the underworld. The versatility of 's functions is visible on a Roman-era funerary monument, on whose pediment the goddess is represented as Artemis but wearing the Thracian Phrygian cap, and on the next pediment she is depicted as the Greek chthonic goddess Hecate holding two torches, and finally she is depicted as Persephone holding two torches and seated on a chariot taking her to the underworld.  was thus a goddess with multifaceted qualities, with multiple functions and multiple epithets. In Roman times her many functions meant that she had many images and could be represented by the Graeco-Roman deities Artemis, Diana, Persephone, Selene, Phosphorus and Hecate.

Iconography
The goddess  appeared in Thracian art depicted as a frontal facing isolated head in architectural decorations, often as part of an alternating motif with lotuses or palmettes, or in the centre of a symmetrically branching floral ornament. These depictions represent her role as a goddess of autochthonism, as well as a patron deity of vegetation, which is confirmed by the alternation with palmettes and floral ornaments, which meant that the goddess's head symbolically represented the Tree of Life. These connections to vegetation find parallels among Indo-Iranian peoples, such as the dream of the Median king Astyages in which a large vine that grew out of his daughter's womb covered all of Asia, and the Scythian representation of the goddess Artimpasa seated on a throne out of which a tree grows out.

The goddess  was also depicted in animal motifs, such as on a belt from Lovets and a jug from Rogozen, on which, respectively, palmettes standing for the goddess, and the motif of the goddess's isolated head, alternate with the figures of boars. On a skyphos from Strelcha, fifteen frontal depictions of the goddess's face are represented over a frieze where ram heads in profile and lion faces in frontal position form an alternating motif; while the goddess represented vegetation, the ram and the lion are opponents of each other in animal style art, and this motif was connected to that of two ram heads in profile on each side of a frontal lion face on horse harness appliqués from Mezek, as well as to that of two lions dismembering a dead ram above the figure of the goddess from the handle of a Thracian bronze mirror. This imagery was connected to fertility, and might have been influenced by that of the Phrygian goddess Cybele.

In her form as the virgin-huntress,  was represented with short hair, de-emphasised breasts, and armed with a bow and arrow, with this imagery being inspired by that of the Greek Artemis. As the hearth-goddess,  was represented by the snake: depictions of snakes decorated the hearth of the city of Seuthopolis, thus identifying the hearth-goddess with the serpent.

The virgin  was usually represented chasing prey while holding her bow in one hand and reaching towards her quiver with the other hand. In southwestern Thrace, especially around Philippi,  was usually represented holding a spear and a twig, and on Lemnos she was depicted with two spears in the 7th century BCE. In Greece, where her cult was adopted by Athens,  is depicted wearing a chiton, over which is an animal skin, with a Phrygian cap on her head and two spears in her hands. In Hellenistic times,  is represented holding a sword on a coin of the king Nicomedes I of Bithynia.

In her matron form,  was represented as a woman having experienced marriage and motherhood, and was depicted with large and rounded breasts, which represented her birth-giving and infant-nurturing role, and with long hair styled into a marital braid, and wearing a long chiton and carrying a vase and a blossoming twig symbolizing fullness and fertility.

In this representation,  is mounted on a lioness, implying that this imagery was influenced by that of the Phrygian goddess Cybele from Asia Minor, whose iconography was in turn of Mesopotamian and Elamite origin. The attributes of the goddess's combined virgin and matron depiction reflect her premarital status: due to her position as being on the threshold of a changed social position, she is therefore represented as having a dual nature, which is emphasised by her being represented again twice in mirror images on both sides of the combined virgin-matron goddess image. This representation of  thus was a transitional figure whose "in-betweenness" was represented by her combined virgin-matron attributes, and by the doubling of her figure on each side.

The goddess was flanked on each side by a pair of winged centaurs running towards her: these beings represented the natural world who rejected and even violated human cultural institutions like marriage, manners, the home, and individuation, and represented opposition to civilised life. Below the goddess, in the lower frieze, is depicted a bull, fallen on one knee to symbolise its acceptance to be sacrificed, and attacked by four lions or dogs. The upper and lower frieze respectively represented the female principle, depicted as the goddess, and the male principle, represented by the bull. The overall scene represents the forces of Chaos represented by the centaurs, who are creatures existing on the border between nature and culture, as having invaded the Cosmos at the end of the year, when the powers of order are depleted, and attempted to violate the virgin goddess, and by extension any potential bride. The bull is then defeated by the animal helpers of the goddess and sacrificed to save the world from Chaos. The two friezes on this jug thus depicted the mythology of the Thracian rituals of the new year and represented mythical and ritual moments of transition such as from the natural to the civilised, from the old to the new calendar cycle, and from the virginal to the matronly goddess.

The Snake-Goddess 

This Goddess was the Thracian reflex of the same deity who in the Scythian religion was the Snake-Legged Goddess.

Iconography 
Thracian interpretations of the Scythian Snake-Legged Goddess include her carrying a twig on a jug from the Rogozen Treasure, the caryatids of the Sveshtari tomb, a motif where her legs grow into floral volutes, and in the Thracian Tomb of Sveshtari as caryatids with feminine bodies wearing calathus hats and chiton whose skirts are shaped like lotus blossoms or acanthus leaves and with pleats shaped like floral volutes which have an acanthus between them. Their disproportionally large raised hands, which either hold the volutes or are raised to appear as supporting the entablure, are similar to the goddess with her hands raised to her face depicted on a series of Thracian votive plaques. Above the caryatids, a wall painting depicts a goddess holding a crown and reaching out to an approaching horseman. The overall scene represents a Thracian nobleman's posthumous heroisation and depicts the same elements of the Great Goddess-minor goddess complex found in the relation between the Scythian Great Goddess Artimpasa and the Snake-Legged Goddess. These various depictions represent her role as a goddess of autochthonism, as well as a patron deity of vegetation.

Thracian greaves from Vratsa and Agighiol were decorated with a female mask at the knee and with three pairs of dragons in a way that recalls the image of the Scythian Snake-Legged goddess, who also presided over the hearth. The image of the Gorgon Medusa was also used in the stead of the female mask on Thracian greaves, which not only identified Medusa with the Snake-Goddess, but also demonstrated her connection with vegetation: this imagery is present on pectorals from Mezek, Varbitsa, and Shipka, on an acroterium from Strelcha, and a greave from Vratsa, on which she wears an wreath of ivy, a plant symbolising the "Dionysian" aspect of the god  (that this greave marks only the left leg of the warrior linked him to the underworld, which was also the realm of the goddess).

The Thracian equivalent of the Snake-Legged Goddess might also appear in the series of horse bridle plaques from Letnitsa. One of the plaques depicts a seated male figure (the god  in his role as an ancestral hero, who was Thracian equivalent of the "Scythian Heracles") with a female figure (the Thracian Great Goddess ) straddling him from above, both of them explicitly engaging in sexual intercourse, and symbolising the king's acquirement of royal power through intercourse with the Great Goddess similarly to the Scythian king's obtaining of royal power through his union with Artimpasa. Behind the Great Goddess is another woman, holding a vessel in one hand and in the other one a branch which obscures the view of the hero; this figure is a vegetation goddess with an ectatic aspect, which is symbolised by the vessel she holds, which contains a sacred beverage, and whose connection to the Great Goddess is analogous to that of the Snake-Legged Goddess with Artimpasa.

Unlike the Greek gods who each had a separate function and a clear-cut image,  was a universal god believed to be omnipotent who was worshipped by all the Thracian tribes, having a complex and contradictory nature, as attested by his solar, chthonic, and heroic forms: the Thracian pantheon did not have any specific deity of the Sun or of the underworld, they were instead all aspects of one and the same all-seeing and all-hearing god who was the Sun as well as the ruler of the underworld, and who protected life and health and kept the forces of evil at bay.

The Apsinthii tribe worshipped  as a household, and therefore universal, god, under the name of Pleistorus.

The "Apollonian" 

The solar  was personified as a rock, and to whom horses were sacred. The worship of 's solar aspect who was identified with the Greek Apollo is attested in literary, epigraphic and iconographic records. According to Sophocles, the Sun was the celestial body which was most worshipped by the Thracians, and the cult of the solar deity was already well-developed in Thrace by the late Bronze Age.

The "Dionysian" 
The "Dionysian"  was the personification of wine, which in the Thracian religion was the sacred drink which brought secret knowledge and immortality, and of the plant from which wine was made, the grape, similarly to the role of the soma among Indo-Aryan peoples, the haoma among Iranian peoples, and the mead among Germanic and Slavic peoples. The chthonic, or "Dionysian," 's personification of the sacred drink represented an ancient Indo-European mythological and ritual theme, and he therefore belonged to a type of deity whose various iterations among a number of cultures were nevertheless very similar, such as being associated with the constellation Orion, the bull, and the autumn season. The god's myth and cult reflected the making of wine from the grape, and therefore depicted his killing, dismemberment, and crushing to death, similarly to how the Indo-Aryan deity Soma, the embodiment of the sacred soma drink, was killed by the Asuras. The making of the wine itself was seen as transcending the essential opposition between the raw and the cooked: the wine initially belonged to wild nature and was brought into human culture by cutting and cultivating it, and its fruits were collected, crushed and allowed to ferment until refined into wine, the sacred drink. Thus, the "sufferings" of the plant were seen as reflecting those of  himself, and, like the wine itself, this god had a fiery nature according to which he was born and died from lightning, that is celestial Fire. The "Dionysian"  was seen as a "stranger" not only because he turned the world upside down and destroyed established social norms, especially through him making women leave their homes to go into the wild, but also because he was conceptualised as coming from the outside to reach inside man and inspire him with his cult's ecstatic frenzy.

Since deities of vegetation are always connected to the underworld, this was also the case of the "Dionysian"  as well. Among the Greeks, Dionysus was sometimes believed to be the son of queen of the underworld Persephone, or identified with her husband, the king of the underworld, Hades, and the Thracians under Roman rule represented Dionysys as the one abducting Persephone, and they would pay respects to the dead during the Rosalia festival held in the honour of Dionysus.

Unlike the Greek Dionysys, however, the Thracian chthonic  was a god of divination, and all the famous oracles in Thrace belonged to him and all prophesising was made under the god's divine influence.

The Greek myth of Dionysys and Lycurgus
The Greek myth of Dionysus and Lycurgus preserves the history of the arrival of the cult of Dionysus (Zagreus) in Thrace.

Lycurgus, the king of the Edoni who lived on the shores of the Hellespont, was the son of the god of the North Wind, Boreas. Butes, a son of Boreas by another mother, plotted against his step-brother Lycurgus. When Lycurgus found out about it, instead of harming Butes, he ordered his step-brother and his co-conspirators to take a ship and settle in another land. Butes and his men eventually settled on the island of Strongyle, the future Naxos, where they became pirates. During one of their raids, Butes and his men landed in Drius in Thessaly, where the nurses of Dionysus were celebrating the orgies in honour of the god. Butes abducted the Maenad Coronis, who implored the help of Dionysus. The god turned Butes insane so that he threw himself into a well and drowned in it.

When Dionysus was preparing to lead his army from Asia to Europe, he initially struck a friendship with Lycurgus and then allowed his Maenads to cross into the kingdom of the Edoni, which he thought was a friendly country. However, Lycurgus ordered his soldiers to attack the Maenads during the night with the hope of destroying them and Dionysus, but a Thracian named Charops revealed the plot to Dionysus, whose army was still in Asia. Lycurgus attacked the god's Maenads and massacred them all during the night on Mount Nyseium and then pursued Dionysus himself with a cattle goad, while Dionysus secretly fled into the sea and was given shelter by Thetis. Dionysus then sailed back to his army, which be brought to Thrace, defeated Lycurgus, captured him alive, blinded him, tortured him, and crucified him. After defeating and executing Lycurgus, Dionysus installed Charops as the king of Thrace and initiated him into the secret rites of the mystery cult, thus making him the founder of the Dionysian dynasty in Thrace and a priest-king, with both secular and religious power being henceforth handed down patrilineally.

Dionysus in this myth has a zoomorphic, rather than anthropomorphic, nature, and he is referred to as a bull in Graeco-Roman records of the myth. Therefore, in this myth Lycurgus acts as a "herdsman" just as were initiates of the mystery cult of Dionysus. This myth is also one of sacrificial crisis, whereby Lycurgus reversed the proper order of things by chasing the god like an animal.

This myth of "Dionysus" and Lycurgus recorded the religious conflict resulting from the Dionysian cult's confrontation with the earlier religious beliefs of ancient Thrace. The myth of "Dionysus" and Lycurgus itself presents the arrival of the cult of Zagreus as happening through infiltration by dividing the people of the lands the god sought to conquer, and implies that the cult of Zagreus arrived in Thrace as part of a period of social and political crisis throughout the Balkan peninsula rather than through human migration: the implantation of the Dionysian religion in Thrace was thus the result of social and cultural changes among the peoples of the Balkan peninsula. The social and demographic in the Balkans led to the migration of the Thracian tribes and their colonisation of neighbouring lands, and is reflected in the myth Lycurgus's ordering of his step-brother who had plotted against him to take a ship and settle in another country. This crisis included a struggle between the old cults and the new ones, and the replacement of already present ideologies by other ones, during which the expansion of the cult of Zagreus into Thrace was met with opposition but ultimately prevailed: Lycurgus in this myth represented the brilliance of the Sun, which made inevitable his confrontation with Dionysus, a god born from moisture and who sought refuge in it. The myth of Dionysus and Lycurgus thus represented the clash of the solar and chthonian cults, and the latter triumphed with the death of Lycurgus. Similarly, in Greece, when the king Pentheus of Thebes opposed Dionysus, the god punished him by having him dismembered by the women.

Therefore, in this myth, Dionysus was represented as a deity of kings: out of the political and religious conflict between Dionysus and Lycurgus, the old Thracian dynasty was destroyed. And by the god's installation of Charops as king, both the religious character and the dynastic line of the country was changed, with the secret knowledge of the mystery cult handed down patrilineally being necessary for holding power. This myth therefore codified the divine origin of kingship, and the secret rites of the mystery cults were attributes of investiture.

The combined 
The arrival of the cult of Zagreus-Dionysus in Thrace and its initial struggle with the solar cult is preserved in the Greek myth of Dionysus and Lycurgus, where Lycurgus represented the brilliance of the Sun, and his death at the hands of Zagreus-Dionysus represented the triumph of the god. The myth of Orpheus attests that there was a counter-movement to the implantation of the cult of Zagreus-Dionysus in Thrace in the form of a return to the early solar cults, and Orpheus made peace between "Apollo" and "Dionysus", after which they combined into a single god in the Thracian religion.

In north-eastern Thrace, it was the Hero's chthonic aspects which were emphasised, and he was represented with a beard, a long robe and a cornucopia, which were attributes of Pluto, the Graeco-Roman king of the netherworld.

The myth of Maron
According to Greek myth, Maron was a member of the same tribe as Orpheus, the Cicones, and was a son of Evanthes who was a son of Dionysus, or alternatively Maron himself directly a son of Dionysus.

Maron was himself a king and a contemporary of Lycurgus, Butes, and Orpheus. After they had all died and Maron had become old, Dionysus appointed him as the guardian of his cult and instructed him to found a city which he would name Maroneia after himself, after which he lived in the sanctuary of the god, which was also Maron's royal palace.

In the Odyssey, Maron was a priest of Apollo who offered Odysseus with twelve jars of sweet unmixed wine, that is a divine drink, as well as gold and silver, thus combining within Maron both the Apollonian and Dionysiac principles. Maron himself poured the sweet wine, and only his favourite wife and a female servant had keys to his cellar, representing the right and obligation of the king alone to offer wine and distribute food. Maron was therefore a representative of the Thracian king-high priest, with his role as a city founder who gave his name to a city, him being the one who poured the sweet wine, and the rich presents with which he offered the favours of his subjects and guests showing his royal status. The combination of Apollonian and Dionysiac principles within Maron attests of the union of the solar and chthonic cults following Orpheus's reforms.

The "Arean" 

As a divine warrior,  was equated by Herodotus with the Greek Ares., of whom the Greeks considered the Thracians to be the obvious embodiments because of their warlike culture, and as early as the 7th century BCE, the Greek poet Archilochus called the Thracians the "gods of battle".

In accordance to the Indo-European conceptualisation of the war-god as having a lupine character, the "Arean" aspect of  had a wolfish aspect. The god's epithets, which referred to his lupine character, therefore included , meaning "bestial" or "rich in game". Among the Thracians' Crestonian neighbours, this god was named , meaning "dog-strangler". According to the Greek poet Lycophron, the Thracian "Ares" had a wolf-like appearance.

Similarly to how the Scythians worshipped their god of war in the form of a short akinakes sword on which they poured the blood of men and horses sacrificed to the god, the Thracians might also have ritually represented the "Arean"  in the form of a sword. A short akinakes-type bronze sword found in Medgidia, on whose haft was engraved the image of an eagle holding a snake in its beak, might have been such a ritual sword.

The Hero 
This "Arean" aspect of  himself had a "Heroic" aspect, now known as the Thracian Hero or the Thracian Horseman, who was always represented a horseback hunter.

This association between the god and the horse had multiple facets: since the horse was sacred to the Sun-god and was also a symbol of the underworld among many ancient peoples including the Thracians, it was therefore the permanent companion of the solar-chthonic god , who was always represented on horseback.  was also associated with the horse in this capacity as a god of the aristocracy and royalty since the horse was the symbol of the tribal aristocracy's political, economic, and military power; Thracian aristocrats and their retinue were usually mounted while ordinary warriors were not; and the Odrysae recruited cavalry only from their own tribe and infantry from other tribes. It is therefore not a coincidence that the heroes such as Rhesus, Olynthus, and Brangas in the myths derived from the mythology of the Hero are always princes. The hunt, which in Thrace was customarily carried out on horseback, was a royal privilege among the Mycenaeans, the Thracians, and the peoples of Western Asia and was therefore part of the iconography of heroes: heroes were represented fighting real animals or mythical creatures in Hittite, Assyrian, and Achaemenian art.

The struggle against the Chaos-dragon
The Hero  ensured the preservation of the wordly order and the normal course of life by fighting the forces of evil, and therefore in myth he underwent an epic journey on a mythical road filled with danger, and where he encountered unexpected opponents which personified Chaos, destruction, evil, and death.

This mythical combat against the monster (which was similar to the Anatolian, Iranian, and Indo-Aryan myths of the fight against the Chaos-dragon) followed the motif of the ritual fight between heroes and monsters being a test of valour, and its goal was to force the Chaos-dragon to free the waters it had stopped, to return the cattle stolen by it (representations of two dragons on each side of a bull's head on a Thracian helmet from Băiceni show that the Hero's Chaos-dragon enemy was a stealer of bulls), and to free women abducted by it, that is to ensure nature's fertility, and the continuation of humanity. This journey also represented the transition of the Thracian young warrior from adolescence to manhood, and the transition of the Thracian prince into kingship. A series of metal appliqués from the Letnitsa Treasure fully depict the struggle of  against the Chaos-dragon:
on one piece is a depiction of the three-headed Chaos-dragon
on another piece, a sea-nymph riding a hippocampus represents the freeing of the waters from the Chaos-dragon
another piece is decorated with the image of a maiden holding in her hand a mirror, which was a symbol of marriage
on another piece is a representation of the Hero receiving a bow, which was a royal insignia
the last piece depicted the Hero entering in hierogamy with the Great Goddess  herself while the Snake-Goddess blesses the union
The royal investiture scenes depicting the goddess, such as the goddess  about to give a rhyton to a horseman riding towards her on the plate of the Brezovo gold ring, and the goddess walking leftwards and is followed by a horseman holding a rhyton she has just given him on the Rosovets ring, represent the Hero 's union with the Mother Goddess, an act which ensured the plentifulness of the country, but was also indispensable for him to obtain royal power. The hierogamy scene of the Letnitsa Treasure thus represented the Hero  (with whom the king was identified and an earthly substitute for) explicitly entering in a hierogamy with the Great Goddess. In this role,  possessed the attributes common to the hearth goddess throughout various Indo-European religions: she was bound to the circle of the hearth and never left the home, thus always being a maid but never a wife, and was associated to the snake, and, since the snake was the representation of the "below," therefore to the earth itself. The hearth-goddess also symbolised the continuity of the clan, which, by guaranteeing the legitimacy of the royal line and the continuity of power, was an important part of the Thracian royal customs. These various attributes together made of  the goddess of the "autochthonic principle," that is the concept of a ruler's right to rule the land he inhabited deriving from him originating from that place, which held a very important place in archaic societies such as in Thrace, was attested there by the presence of snake-shaped hearth decorations in ancient Thrace. This importance of the hearth-goddess as the embodiment of the "autochthonic principle" is reflected across various Indo-European religions in the emphasis on the hearth-goddess in the rituals through which kings would take over new territory:
according to legend, the Argive Perdiccas I used his knife to cut a circle on the floor around the hearth of the king of Lebaea before becoming king of Macedonia
whenever the Macedonian king Philip II conquered or sought to conquer a new country, he would marry its princess, that is he would ritually unite with its local personification of Hestia (the Greek hearth-goddess).

This concept of the Thracian Hero (and the Thracian king who was his substitute on Earth) obtaining royal power through uniting with the great goddess was closely similar to the Scythian custom whereby the Scythian ancestral hero  (and, by extension, his descendant the Scythian king) was believed to acquire royal power by uniting with the Scythian goddess Artimpasa, who was herself the Scythian equivalent of the Thracian Great Goddess . Therefore, another goal of the fight against the Chaos-dragon was the elevation of the Hero himself to the status of ruler, which was symbolised by the bow, which was similarly a symbol of kingship in Achaemenid Persia, and this insignia of power was given to the Hero  by the Great Goddess herself as part of his investiture.

The boar hunt 
Representations of the Hero  aiming a spear at a boar in front of a tree, and following a motif attested from as early as the 4th century BCE on a silver belt from Lovets, had an analogous meaning as the god's struggle with the Chaos-dragon and similarly represented the Hero's role in the preservation of humanity and of the natural order of the world through rebirth and reproduction:
the tree, always depicted in leaf, symbolised the rebirth of Nature, and was a Thracian version of the Tree of Life
the wild boar, on the contrary, was associated with life and death in ancient times in Asia Minor and the Balkans:
in Greek myth, a boar dismembered the Cretan Zeus
Heracles earned immortality by killing the boar of Erymanthus
Meleager died because he gave up the head of the boar of Calydon he had killed)
the boar was also an enemy of fertility in ancient religions:
the boars of Calydon, Erymanthus and Mysia destroyed crops in the fields
in Gaulish religion, the boar dug up the roots of the apple tree, which was the northern version of the Tree of Life

The boar also held a special symbolic status by representing the Indo-European god of war since, like the wild warrior initiate, it was an undifferentiated animal, being both herbivorous and predatory, land-dwelling but preferring marshes and swamps, and therefore a borderline creature existing at the threshold of the wild and the domesticated. These qualities meant the wild boar was a symbol of death, as well as of Chaos where all attributes and qualities are undifferentiated, making it a fitting main rival of the Hero, and analogously, of a Thracian prince aspiring to be king (the theme of a mythical hero-king fighting a boar is also present among Iranian and Indo-Aryan peoples).

The role of the boar hunt as an initiatory trial also had genealogical implications: succeeding in the hunt assured the continuation of the royal dynasty, and failing it led to the end of the dynasty:
in Greek myth, the dynasty of Calydon ended with the death of Meleager
in Greek myth again, it was to prevent Zeus from founding a new dynasty that the boar, which was a symbol of Cronus, dismembered him
historically, it was after the Lydian king Croesus's son Atys died in a boar hunt that his kingdom was conquered by the Persian Cyrus
Thus, the struggle between the animal and the Hero represented the struggle to protect life itself, that is the life of the people, the prince, and the royal line: the hunt was therefore, for Thracian princes, not only a trial of initiation, but also one of consecration, and if they failed it they would die and never become king, and their dynasty would end. Therefore, by slaying the boar in front of the Tree of Life,  protected the continuation of the cycle of life, and was therefore the god of renascent nature and the guardian of the worldly order. In some versions of the iconography of the Hero's boar hunt, an altar stands between the god and the boar, and a snake is always coiled on the Tree of Life:
since snakes wake up from hibernation in spring, and sleep symbolised death while awakening symbolised rebirth, the snake represented the awakening of nature in spring
the shedding of skins by snakes in Spring was also a symbol of rebirth, and therefore of immortality

Therefore, in these scenes it was by destroying the boar, that is the enemy of life, and saving the Tree of Life, that the Hero won immortality. The doubling of the Hero and the boar on each side of the Tree of Life on some of the depictions of the boar hunt represented the dual essence of the god, but was also connected to the myth of the twin horsemen.

Since the Thracians did not perceive the world in terms of linear time, and therefore conceptualised their religion and myths not as histories of ancient pasts, but as occurring in the present, and there was no difference between the mythical and heroic past and the present in Thracian religion, the Hero  was believed to still be performing his valorous deeds in the present on another plane of existence in heaven which was not necessarily separate from the world of the living necessarily in an abrupt way.

The wolf fight
The "Arean"  fitted the motif of the Indo-European war-god's struggle with a monstrous wolf or dog as his principal deed, a theme also present in the Celtic and Greek myths of Cú Chulainn and Heracles. Fittingly, the young Thracian Hero's opponents included the lion, the bear, the wolf, and the panther, all animals considered to be "royal" and whose hunting skills the initiates could learn from; thus, their defeat by the hunter brought him glory and the animal's powers passed on to him.

The Ancestor  
 was a divine ancestor of humanity, not unlike Iranian heroic progenitors such as the Scythian  and Scythes, and the Zoroastrian Yima and Haošiiaŋha, and like them he was the first king. As the tribal ancestor,  was therefore an ancestral hero, and was given a local name by each tribe, such as Treres was his name as the ancestor of the Treri,  in his role as the ancestor of the Dolonci, Strymon as the ancestor of the Strymonians, and Odrus as the ancestor of the Odrysians.

The Thracians' genealogical myth was related to the Hero 's victory over the Chaos-dragon, and paralleled that of their Scythian neighbours. This Thracian genealogical myth was itself recorded in several Greek myths:

The myth of Rhesus 
In one myth, the river-god Strymon had three sons: the oldest was Rhesus, the second was Olynthus, and the youngest son was Brangas.

After the Thracian king Eioneus was banished, he was succeeded by the first son of Strymon by a nymph or a Muse, Rhesus. Rhesus, who became the first Edoni priest-king, possessed magical weapons, was a hunter, warrior, and horse-breeder, thus himself representing the ideal Thracian king, and the mythology of the Hero  was reflected in his figure. Rhesus's large number of horse herds was a symbol of his status as a member of the royal aristocracy, and the horses being described as whiter than snow and as whiter than the feathers of the river swan in the myth attested of Rhesus's connection with the "Apollonian" . Rhesus's status as a famous hunter also denoted his belonging to the royalty, since the hunt was a royal privilege among the peoples of southeast Europe and western Asia, and according to myth he had expelled pestilence from the Rhodope Mountains. Rhesus's attributes and traits such as his magical weapons and him being loved by women defined him as a typical warrior-hero, hence why he was the first king of his dynasty; Rhesus's herds of horses denoted him as a hunter (the hunt was a test of valour for kings), but were also a symbol of wealth, implying he was very rich and therefore had economic power, similar to the Zoroastrian Yima, who is described in the Avesta as having many fields and great herds of bulls to represent how rich he was; his weapons were an important mark of social rank in the unstable times when he lived. Rhesus's hunting moreover represented the act of sacrifice; his possession of many herds of white horses, which were symbols of royalty, was a defining attribute of rulers in their role of animal agriculturists.

Rhesus fell in love with Arganthone, who, unlike the rest of the women, was not a housewife, but a huntress, and despised men and did not want to interact with them before meeting Rhesus, thus being a variant of the huntress . The love between Rhesus and Arganthone therefore represented the union between the Hero , with whom the king was identified, and the goddess . Rhesus went to help Priam during the Trojan War and was killed, either by Diomedes or by the goddess Athena. Rhesus's body was itself buried in the "silver-veiled mountain", and after his funeral, wild animals would willingly offer themselves as a sacrifice at his heroum.

The second son of Strymon, Olynthus, died during a lion hunting trial when he purposely attempted to fight a lion (which in the myth stood for a sacrificial rite) and his death sanctified the place where a city was to be built, and therefore represented the priestly function.

The youngest son, Brangas, mourned Olynthus and buried him at the very spot where he had died, and then went to Sithonia where he founded a prosperous city named after Olynthus. Brangas represented the agriculturalist role of the king.

In the myth, the dynasty of Strymon replaced that of Eioneus after the latter was banished. Rhesus himself was an excellent hunter according to the legend, meaning that he had fulfilled the test of valour necessary to reign: the theme of this myth is that the most deserving one, who had passed the test of valour, was the one who inherited the kingdom, similarly to the Scythian genealogical myth, where  gave to the Snake-Legged Goddess a belt, a cup, and a bow, and instructed to her that the one of their three sons who could gird his waist with the belt and draw the bow would become king. Similar myths of the testing of the king through a contest are also present in Greek religion, such as in the myth of Odysseus and the suitors of Penelope, and of Oedipus and the sphinx.

After Rhesus's death, however, his successor Olynthus died fighting a lion — that is, he failed the test of valour — and Brangas going into exile signalled the end of the dynasty following this failure.

The first two brothers, Rhesus and Olynthus, respectively represented the opposites of "nature" and "culture," which was reflected in how a river in the Troad was named after Rhesus while the city built by Brangas was named after Olynthus.

The story of Arganthone falling in love with Rhesus and mourning his death fits the West Asian theme of a goddess of life falling in love with a hero only to lose him to death so that the balance between life and death could be maintained (see the myths of Attis and Adonis). After he died, Rhesus's mother declared that he would not go into the dark earth, but that Persephone would give her back his soul who would go to a cave in the "silver-veined" Mount Pangaeum, where he beheld light as a prophet of Bacchus (Dionysus), reflecting the status of the cave as a chthonic symbol in Thracian religion, and linking both the chthonic (the cave) and solar (beholding light) principles within Rhesus's own fate.

The myth of Pallene 
According to another myth, the son of Poseidon and Ossa was Sithon, the king of the Thracian Chersonese. Sithon in turn had a daughter by the nymph Mendeis who was named Pallene.

Since there were many suitors courting Pallene, Sithon decided that only the one who could defeat him in combat could marry Pallene and become the next king of the Thracian Chersonese, and both the king Merops of Anthemus and the king Periphetes of Mygdonia died fighting for Pallene's hand.

After this, Sithon decided that the suitors had to contend against each other rather than against him to wed Pallene and succeed Sithon. When two new suitors, Dryas and Cleitus competed, Pallene employed a ruse to make Dryas lose.

When Sithon found out about Pallene's ruse, he threatened to execute her until the goddess Aphrodite appeared during the night and interceded on her behalf.

After Sithon's death, Pallene and Cleitus inherited of his kingdom, henceafter named Sithonia and Pallene.

The theme of this myth is that the most deserving one, who had passed the test of valour, was the one who inherited the kingdom, similarly to the Scythian genealogical myth, where  gave to the Snake-Legged Goddess a belt, a cup, and a bow, and instructed to her that the one of their three sons who could gird his waist with the belt and draw the bow would become king. Similar myths of the testing of the king through a contest are also present in Greek religion, such as in the myth of Odysseus and the suitors of Penelope, and of Oedipus and the sphinx.

The princess Pallene herself represented the a form of the Thracian Great Goddess , and therefore was a personification of her country. The similarity of the name of Mendeis with that of the Thracian Great Goddess,  (the consonants /b/ and /m/ were interchangeable in the Thracian language), suggests that Mendeis was herself a form of the goddess. The Greek goddess Aphrodite in the myth also represents the essence of the Thracian Great Goddess , hence making her intervention not a coincidence.

The theme of the myth of Pallene therefore was that Cleitus could become king of her land only by marrying her, the local form of the Great.

The "Hermesian" 
The identification of this god with the Greek Hermes likely resulted from the latter's role as the god of vows, but also from his function as a mediator, especially between Heaven and Earth, which was an important aspect of kingship, since the role of the ruler within Thracian society was to mediate between various groups and individuals, between his people and outsiders, and between human community and the gods, hence why the king also had to be a priest.

Representations of the "Hermesian"  as driving cattle are related to the use of cattle as a form of currency among archaic peoples such as the Thracians, and to the transferring of their ownership being used to symbolised the society's social dynamics, with whoever possessed more cattle being richer and powerful. Hence, the "Hermesian"  was a god associated with cattle as a form of mobile wealth, as opposed to the hearth-goddess , who was the goddess of inanimate wealth associated with the home.

Among the Odrysae, the local form of the "Hermesian"  was the Hero Tereus, a legendary king of Daulis to whom the historical founder of the Odrysae kingdom and dynasty, Teres I, had become assimilated as part of the traditional identification of the king with the Hero , especially in the latter's "Hermesian" aspect. This is why, referring to the mythological marriage between Tereus and Procne, the daughter of the king Pandion of Athens, the Odrysian king Seuthes II declared to Xenophon that he considered the Athenians as his kinsmen when they were about to enter the king's tower to participate in a feast.

And by the god's installation of Charops as king, both the religious character and the dynastic line of the country was changed, with the secret knowledge of the mystery cult handed down patrilineally being necessary for holding power. This myth therefore codified the divine origin of kingship, and the secret rites of the mystery cults were attributes of investiture. The connection of the "Dionysian"  with kingship is also visible in the myth of Maron where the latter is a king-high priest who is a son of Dionysus, and in the myth of Orpheus, where the latter is a reformer of the cult of "Dionysus" who counselled the king Midas; hence, the Odrysian kings Amadocus II and Teres II were depicting the "Dionysian"  on their coins. The "Dionysian" , as a god of kingship, was also a higher form of his son and substitute, the demigod and king-high priest Orpheus/.

Due to the "Dionysian"  role as a deity of kingship, one of the main cults of the Thracian city of Seuthopolis was dedicated to this god. This role of the god is why his symbol, the ivy, was a symbol of political and religious power, and was the main motif used to decorate the many sacrificial altars in the royal palace and the aristocrats' homes in Seuthopolis.

According to Herodotus, the Greek Perdiccas I, after having fled Argos, was able to become king of Macedonia with the help of Dionysus, hence this god was also a dynastic deity among the Thracians' Macedonian neighbours, which is why Alexander the Great was considered a "new Dionysus" and all Hellenistic rulers devoted a special cult in his honour.

Furthermore, the Thracian kings were assimilated to the Hero , who in Thracian mythology was usually the son of a deity, and the hence kings claimed divine ancestry, and the mythological origin of royal dynasties was based on the attribution of a divine origin to royal power.  in his "Apollonian" aspect was thus a god of kingship due to his multiple associations with gold, such as his symbolic animal the griffin, his homeland in the legendary Hyperborea, his many epithets derived from the Thracian word for gold, and the source of treasures being the inside of the earth. The etymology of royal names and the practice of ritual union with the Mother Goddess are thus evidence that the Thracian kings took over the functions of the Hero  in the human realm, and the kings therefore patterned their actions on the divine Hero.

The Initiator 

's warrior aspect was also connected to initiation, since he fitted the motif of the Indo-European war-god's struggle with a monstrous wolf or dog as his principal deed, with this struggle also being the theme of an initiation ritual associated with that myth.

Iconography
Earrings from Mesembria in the form of winged figures with solar discs over their heads likely represented the solar , and similar and likely connected representations of the solar deity are found among the Thracians' Paeonians neighbours, who worshipped the Sun in the form of a disc at the top of a wooden pole.

On a jug from Vratsa, the solar  is represented as two winged chariots depicted symmetrically around a large palmette representing the Tree of Life. The doubling of the chariot represents the rotation of the Sun between the night and the day, as well as the dual essence of the god.

's "Apollonian" and "Dionysian" forms were both represented on many votive tablets in the form of the Greek gods Apollo and Dionysus depicted as horsemen. Neither Apollo nor Dionysus were represented as horsemen anywhere except in Thrace, where the horse was the sacred animal of the Sun-god and every deity was assigned the attributes of a mounted hunter.

The earliest depictions of 's "Dionysian" form in Thrace provided him with attributes showing both his foreign and wild nature, such as his wearing of a nebris fawn skin cloak, and him being accompanied by drunken companions including satyrs and sileni and maenads, who were his frenzied followers, all depicted moving in an ecstatic dance. Many Thracian vessels were decorated with Dionysiac attributes, such as images of the god himself, his characteristic plants, the ivy and grape wine, and other of his symbols.

A Thracian rhyton-jug from Borovo depicted themes of the cult of  opposing "nature" (represented by blood, wild plants, frenzied dancing, erotic play, and intoxication) to "culture" (depicted by wine diluted with water, the careful dancing of Eros accompanied by music, and the marriage ritual).

A Thracian image of a winged centaur on whose shoulders lie a strangled wolf might be an early representation 's warrior-god role.

As the warrior god,  is depicted in the Letnitsa Treasure as a mounted hero preparing to fight a bear after having already defeated a wolf, lying dead and upside down beneath the horse's hooves, with both the wolf and the bear being symbols of warriors.  was also represented fighting a boar, and on one jug from the Rogozen Treasure, the god is doubled on each side of a boar, throwing at the boar one spear, which is a magical spear given by the goddess , and the only one that could kill the animal under her protection, and still holding the second spear in the other hand. This imagery is derived from ancient Iranian seals.

As the Thracian Hero,  was usually represented on votive reliefs as horseman:
most often, the Hero accompanied by a lion or a dog, and aiming a spear at a boar hiding behind an altar, next to which is a snake coiled around a tree, and with one, two, or three women standing nearby
on other reliefs, the Hero is returning from hunting, and his dogs or lions are leaping up trying to get a bite of his quarry, which is held high
on yet other reliefs, the Hero is represented holding a bowl in his hand and riding to the altar in triumph

On a 4th-century BCE belt from Lovets, the image of the Hero aiming his spear and the boar are repeated and mirrored around the Tree of Life to symbolise the dual essence of both. The duplication might also have been connected to the myth of the twin-Cabeiri.

The Hero  was often depicted with three heads, with the multiplication of the face, body or limbs being an archaic form of representing omnipotence, similarly to the three-faced gods of the Indus Valley civilisation from around 2000 BCE and the Luristan bronzes of around 1000 BCE. In Roman times, the Roman Sun-god Sol and Moon-goddess Luna were sometimes depicted above the Hero to represent his connection to the solar and chthonian cults. In the sanctuary of Lozen, he was called Apollo  and depicted with long hair, a lyre, and a long mantle, all attributes of the Graeco-Roman light-god Apollo. In north-eastern Thrace, it was the Hero's chthonic aspects which were emphasised, and he was represented with a beard, a long robe and a cornucopia, which were attributes of Pluto, the Graeco-Roman king of the netherworld. In his warrior role, the Hero was given the attributes of Ares on reliefs dedicated to Thracian warriors.

In his warrior role, the Hero was represented with a helmet and a shield, and in rock reliefs from around Philippi, he is represented swooping down on an enemy. In the Roman period, the Hero was given attributes of Ares in reliefs dedicated to Thracian warriors.

In his role as a protective ancestor, the Hero was represented on votive tablets with a shield on his left arm.

A series of metal appliqués from the Letnitsa Treasure fully depict the struggle of  against the Chaos-dragon:
on one piece is a depiction of the three-headed Chaos-dragon
on another piece, a sea-nymph riding a hippocampus represents the freeing of the waters from the Chaos-dragon
another piece is decorated with the image of a maiden holding in her hand a mirror, which was a symbol of marriage
on another piece is a representation of the Hero receiving a bow, which was a royal insignia
the last piece depicted the Hero marrying the Great Goddess  herself

The "Hermesian"  was represented on the coins of the Derrones tribe as driving cattle, using imagery similar to Greek depictions of Hermes stealing the cattle of Apollo, and following a common motif in Indo-European religions.

On some coins of the Derrones, the "Hermesian"  was depicted bearded and wearing a wide-brimmed hat, and driving an ox cart. Above the ox is a rosette, a solar symbol, and below it is a palmette, a chthonian symbol.

Orpheus

Only through Orpheus's coming did the Cosmos start to function, and both the creation of the physical world and the beginning of human society were brought into existence. Orpheus was connected to  not only because he was a cultural reformer who founded a religious doctrine, but also through him being the one who taught the Thracians to farm (which parallels the Greek myth of Triptolemus and Arcas teaching their tribesmen to farm after learning it from Demeter).

Orpheus/ was therefore a type of deity called a deus otiosus ("idle god"), to which also belonged the Greek Cronus, the Roman Saturn, and the Indo-Aryan , who all have certain common traits, such as being kings of the underworld who personify the "middle heaven," are social as well as cosmic mediators, and have earthly incarnations during which they are priests who possess arcane sacral knowledge and always withdraw from power. Orpheus thus personified the priestly role of the Thracian ruler, attested in the Thracian incantation "Our king , being himself god," and was reflected in his role as a poet and singer, which embodied the concept of the power of words and followed the Indo-European concept of the poet's religious role as the mediator between the gods and humanity. Thus, Orpheus's songs consisted of the sacred knowledge of Thracian tribal oral tradition and revealed the will of the gods, hence why they had a magical effect on humans, animals, trees, and rocks. The myth of the Thracian Orpheus was also a myth of shamanistic initiation, and his life symbolised the initiatory process: his singing represented the use of oral transmission in archaic religion, his behaviour included aspects of gender transformation, he descended into and returned from the underworld, and his body was dismembered and the pieces thrown into a river, with his bones being more important than his flesh.

After acquiring this secret knowledge,  returned to his homeland, bringing enlightenment with him and earning the respect of notables and the people because he could interpret the omens. The king of the Getae, who himself ruled in oppositional terms, that is in terms of both familiar and alien, and of both nature and culture (a theme which again finds a parallel in Indo-Iranian customs, where the Indo-Aryan king was described in terms of agriculture, in opposition to the jungle), well-received , who conversed with him in the desert of the mountain, similarly to how ancient Indo-Aryan kings went into the jungle to obtain spiritual knowledge from a Brahmin or from the god Prajapati. This cave was secluded from the rest of the world except to the king and his attendants, to whom  taught the doctrine of the immortality of the soul, according to which neither he nor his companions nor their descendants would ever truly die, but would instead go somewhere where they would attain eternal bliss. At the same time he was preaching,  was building a cave as a home for himself, suddenly disappeared from the Thracians, and hid from his tribe in this cave for three years. The Thracians were grieved at 's loss and mourned him as if he were dead, but on the fourth year he gathered his tribe in this cave and appeared to them in a mythical equivalent of a mysterial rite re-enacting his own birth, to initiate the aristocrats of the Getae to his teachings, that is to convince them of the truth of the doctrine of immortality he had taught them. This process of the initiation of the king by Orpheus was recorded in an ancient Greek myth, according to which Midas, the king of the Thracians' Bryges neighbours, listened to the teachings of Orpheus on Mount Piereia. Orpheus/ was therefore a high priest as well as a king and the founder of the institution of the king-high priest. After his departure from the world of humans, this function passed on to the kings, and Orpheus/ himself became an anthropodaemon who uttered prophecies to the kings-high priests, who were the only ones permitted to listen to his counsel.

's building of an underground dwelling is paralleled in Iranian version of the flood myth, where, after the gods decided to cull the Earth's overpopulation, Ahura Mazda instructed Yima to keep samples of all living creatures alive winter by building a cave out of clay. The cave in Thracian religion was a chthonic symbol, and 's cave dwelling itself was connected to the Indo-European conceptualisation of the afterlife as a clay house and to the association of clay with death; 's cave dwelling this again paralleled Yima's abode located far away from starlight, and just like Yima conducted the souls of the dead to a happy abode,  promised to the Thracians a paradise where they would join him instead of dying.

As the substitute for his father 's "Dionysian" aspect, Orpheus/ was also a lower form of the god's king-high priest role.

The Greek myth of Dionysus and Orpheus
After defeating and executing Lycurgus, Dionysus installed Charops as the king of Thrace and initiated him into the secret rites of the mystery cult, thus making him the founder of the Dionysian dynasty in Thrace and a priest-king, with both secular and religious power being henceforth handed down patrilineally.

The myth of the Greek Orpheus recorded of the struggle between the native Thracian solar-cult and the newly arrived Dionysian cult and their eventual merger into a single cult: Orpheus, who had inherited the mysteries of Dionysus from his father, reverted along with his tribesmen to the old solar-worship of the time of Lycurgus by holding the Sun-god as the supreme deity and calling him Apollo, and every day Orpheus would wake up and climb Mount Pangaeum to wait for sunrise so that the first being he saw was the Sun, that is to say Orpheus had reformed the mysteries of Dionysus by combining them with the old Thracian solar-cult. Orpheus in this myth was also similar to Apollo, being a musician who could enchant the beasts, birds of prey, trees and stones with his songs, similarly to the god Apollo. Since ancient peoples believed musical and divinatory skills to be connected, in addition to being a singer, Orpheus was also a diviner and a sorcerer, which again attested of his Apollonian quality. The Argonauts asked Orpheus join on their journey because he knew the secrets of sorcery, and he initiated the Argonauts into the mysteries, interpreted omens, and told the story of the creation of the world and the gods. Another Apollonian attribute of Orpheus was his skill as a healer who had found renown because he discovered cures against diseases, to which was connected his music's ability to calm the passions of enemies and making people forget everything.

A more direct Greek record of the connection of Orpheus with the underworld and his similarity to Dionysus rests in his role as one of the initiators of the Eleusinian Mysteries, themselves founded by the Thracian Eumolpus and dedicated to the chthonic deities Demeter, Persephone, and Hades, to whom was later added Dionysus as the son of Persephone because of his association in Anatolia with the Mother of Gods, who in the Eleusinian Mysteries were personified by Demeter and her daughter Persephone. Orpheus thus founded the Eleusinian Mysteries, that is the mysteries of Demeter and Persephone, and introduced the mystery cult of Dionysus, which arrived into Greece from Thrace, with that of the Eleusinian Mysteries of Demeter, that is of the Great Mother of the Gods, whose cult arrived from Crete or Phoenicia to Greece via Thrace. Orpheus's wife Eurydice soon died of a snake-bite: Dionysus's Meanads fastened their animal skins and their wreaths with snakes and allowed them to lick their faces without being bitten since they were under the protection of the god; however, Eurydice's protection was removed by Dionysus and therefore died from interacting with snakes as a warning of the god to Orpheus before his final punishment. Unconsolable at the death of Eurydice, Orpheus calmed down Cerberus and pleased Hades and Persephone with his music and they allowed him to take Eurydice back from the underworld on condition that he should not look at her before the Sun-god he worshipped had seen her, only for him to lose her again because he looked at her before the Sun could. This myth of Orpheus's descent into the underworld is another record of the chthonic association of Orpheus, and it also paralleled the Greek myth of Dionysus's own descent into the underworld, from where he was successfully able to free his mother Semele.

Dionysus finally sent the Maenads to punish Orpheus: the women of the Cicones, whom Orpheus had forbidden to participate in the orgiastic rites of Dionysus although the god's retinue was composed of only women, and who resented that Orpheus had deprived them of their men by convincing them to accompany him on his wanderings, decided to kill Orpheus. Initially afraid to act out of fear of their husbands, the women found the courage they needed when they drank wine: it was by the direct intervention of Dionysus, who roused them through the wine, that they became Maenads, dismembered Orpheus and scattered the pieces of his body. The death of Orpheus was exactly like that of Pentheus and was typically Dionysiac.

However, in one version of the Greek myth of Orpheus, he committed suicide out of despair from Eurydice's death so he could join her in the afterlife, which paralleled the myth of Dionysus persuading Artemis to kill Ariadne, with whom he had fallen in love, so he could bring her with him into the underworld, itself a repetition of the myth of the abduction of Persephone by Hades; the common theme of these parallel myths of Orpheus and Dionysus is that they had to live in the underworld to enjoy love and happiness, and the legend of Eurydice itself might have originated as an explanation of Orpheus's recurrent descents into the underworld, thus attesting of his nature as an early deity of plant life who was subsumed into the Dionysiac cult.

Orpheus was buried at Leibethra and Dionysus predicted that the city would be destroyed by the waters of the river when the Sun would see the bones of Orpheus. The burial mound of Orpheus became a shrine, and his ashes were held in a stone urn at the top of a column located on the road from Dion to Mount Piereia, thus being placed between Heaven and Earth and exposed to the Sun. On Lesbos, the lyre of Orpheus was buried under the sanctuary of Apollo while his head was buried under that of Dionysus, where it continued to make prophecies until the god Apollo destroyed these prophecies' force since he saw these as a violation of his own authority.

After his death, Orpheus became a member of the court of the underworld's rulers and played his lyre near their palace, having earned this position due to being the founder of the mysteries of Demeter and Persephone.

Orpheus, as both a member of the "Dionysian dynasty" and an oracle who knew the secret rites of the mysteries and the way to immortality, and could guide the souls of men, was a representation of the priest-king function of the Thracian rulers.

Orpheus's son Musaeus inherited the Eleusinian Mysteries from his father and led them when Heracles went to Athens and participated in the rites.

Musaeus himself later challenged the Muses to a competition, with the conditions being that his eyes would be put out if he lost, but would be allowed to marry each of them, and therefore become the king of the land of music, if he won. This story preserved the story of the Hero 's hierogamy with the great goddess .

Orpheus in Thracian Orphism
In revenge for not allowing them to see or participate in the mysteries reserved for men, the women of the Cicones tribe drink wine and take up the weapons of their men left at the entrance of the chamber where they were celebrating the Orphic mysteries, thus becoming Maenads possessed by divine fury, and dismember Orpheus and throw his dismembered parts in the Hebrus river. Henceforth, legend claimed that whenever 's chthonic aspect (Dionysus-Zagreus) was worshipped on this mountain, the cithara plant would resound like a lyre or cithara. After killing Orpheus, the Cicones women are marked with tattoos and their husbands returned to them, and they become the mothers of their clans.

Since the Thracians did not perceive the world in terms of linear time, and therefore conceptualised their religion and myths not as histories of ancient pasts, but as occurring in the present, and there was no difference between the mythical and heroic past and the present in Thracian religion, the hero Orpheus/ was believed to still be performing his valorous deeds in the present on another plane of existence in heaven which was not necessarily separate from the world of the living necessarily in an abrupt way.

Since knowledge was associated with light, which was itself seen as a sign of divine mission, the role of Orpheus/ as the bringer of the secret knowledge of immortality was connected to the myth of Orpheus as the first person to worship "Apollo" (the solar ) as a god of the Sun, where he would climb Mount Pangaeum every morning to be the first to greet the Sun.

Although Orpheus was a member of the according to myth, his cult was practised on Mount Pangaeum and Mount Piereia, as well as by the Black Sea and elsewhere, meaning that every Thracian tribe worshipped a similar hero.

Iconography
Unlike for other Thracian deities, there are no known Thracian depictions of Orpheus.

The Hero
The hero was a central figure of Thracian religion, and generally Thracian heroes followed the same pattern: the hero was the son of the Great Goddess, and he fought against the forces of evil to protect the Tree of Life and maintain order in the world. The concept of the hero existed at multiple levels of the Thracian cosmology: the omnipotent and universal god  was himself the divine all-seeing and all-hearing Hero; and as the tribal ancestor,  was also an ancestral hero who was believed to protect nature's fruitfulness, thus being a protector deity to whom the tribe demanded help, and was given a local name by each tribe. Similarly, the god's son Orpheus/ with the Great Mother Goddess  was similarly a hero. The dead in the present were also believed to rise in body and spirit and acquire immortality and thus become heroes as well.

Since the Thracians did not perceive the world in terms of linear time, and therefore conceptualised their religion and myths not as histories of ancient pasts, but as occurring in the present, and there was no difference between the mythical and heroic past and the present in Thracian religion, these various divine, semi-divine, and human heroes were believed to still be performing their valorous deeds in the present on another plane of existence in heaven which was not necessarily separate from the world of the living necessarily in an abrupt way.

The mythology of the hero is reflected in the Greek myth of Rhesus.

The Cabeiri

 and her sons  and Orpheus, to whom, following the tetrad base of the Thracian religion, was added the ityphallic deity Casmilus, became known as the Cabeiri, or the "great ones" on the island of Samothrace, as well as in Thrace proper, where the Cabeiri were worshipped in the Odrysian capital of Seuthopolis. The Cabeiri were seen a group of deities who assured salvation in the afterlife and upheld social order. The Thracian names of the individual Cabeiri are attested from Samothrace as Axiocersus, Axierus, Axiocersa and Casmilus (m ), with the element  (the colour black) signalling their chthonic nature.

The ancient Greeks, among whom the cult of the Cabeiri had spread, believed Thrace to be one of the multiple possible places from where these deities originated.

In some other versions of the cult, however the Cabeiri were twin gods who each in turn experienced death and immortality in heaven and in the underworld.

The Cabeiri were worshipped in a mystery cult, which was a variation of the mystery cult of "Thracian Orphism," and initiation into it was believed to bring order to society as well as to the lives of the cult's initiates.

Nymphs
In Thracian religion, nymphs were closely associated with the goddess  and her cult. The sacrifice of a sow during the Bendideia festival in honour of the goddess was performed in sanctuaries of the nymphs. During the Roman period, the nymphs were seen as symbols of the healing power of springs.

Iconography
On one classical relief, the nymphs are depicted together with the goddess , and on Roman-era votive tablets, they are portrayed alongside the goddess Hera when  was assimilated to her.

Nymphs are represented engaging in love affairs with centaurs on Thracian coins, which is a motif that is also present in Greek mythology, and in Hindu mythology in the form of the betrothal of the Apsaras to the Gandharvas.

Centaurs
In Thracian mythology, Centaurs were anonymous and undifferentiated borderline creatures inhabiting the wild limits of the civilised world without the authority of social regulation: they ate raw food, drank without restraint, did not practise marriage, abducted women, and lived uncivilised lives. They thus had a dual, half-man and half-horse nature, which represented the forces of Chaos.

The role of centaurs as embodiments of Chaos is depicted on the upper frieze a jug from the Rogozen Treasure, where two winged centaurs are shown approaching from each side the goddess , who is herself in a  pose where she holds a dog in each hand. These centaurs represented the forces of Chaos, who are creatures existing on the border between nature and culture, as having invaded the Cosmos at the end of the year, when the powers of order are depleted, and attempted to violate the virgin goddess, and by extension any potential bride. On the frieze, a bull is defeated by the lions or dogs of the goddess and sacrificed to save the world from Chaos. The two friezes on this jug thus depicted the mythology of the Thracian rituals of the new year and represented mythical and ritual moments of transition such as from the natural to the civilised, from the old to the new calendar cycle.

Iconography
In Thracian art, the centaur was depicted as winged, or with human arms and standing on the hind legs of a horse, or with a horse body but with no arms.

The Chaos-dragon

Iconography
The Thracian Chaos-dragon was depicted in various ways, though the most common representation of it was a three-headed or three-bodied snake, sometimes possessing wings or rudimentary legs, thus unifying the elements and spatial zones of the cosmos.

The appearance of the Chaos-dragon was fluid, and across retellings its size could change, it had no fixed colour, and it could be either a snake or a lion (in Moesian folklore, it was a white bear). The dragon itself attacked fiercely and with deceit, caused ulcerous wounds, coiled around its victim and drank its blood, and moved by twisting and turning unlike any normal living creature, and this changeability was represented on Thracian gold objects by images of snakes mottled with scales. Other depictions of the Chaos-dragon showed it as a fish with a boar's head, as a sphinx, a chimaera, or a harpy. The depiction of the Chaos-dragon as a spotted snake with a bird's head combines spatial opposites (the bird representing "above" and the snake representing "below") also has parallels in ancient Indo-Aryan and modern Balkans folklore.

Thracian Mythology

Thracian Orphism
The myths and doctrines constituting the Thracian religion are collectively called by modern-day scholars as "Thracian Orphism," to distinguish it from the Greek Orphism, which was a later derivation from the Thracian religion from the late 6th century BCE.

In the mythology of "Thracian Orphism,"  represented the initial state of the world, which was at rest. The goddess self-fertilised herself and gave birth to a first son, who represented the male principle and had a dual nature, being both a sky-god identified with the Sun, and an underworld-god identified with Fire. This process constituted the four phases of the goddess's life, in which are present the four elements, and which consist consecutively of:
rest, representing Earth.
self-fertilisation, representing Air.
pregnancy, representing Water.
giving birth to her first son, representing Fire.

These four phases were themselves succeeded by four more phases representing the life cycle of :
In the fifth phase,  illuminated the world with his light.
In the sixth phase,  reaches his zenith.
Then, as Zagreus and in accordance to the ritual of him being sacrificed,  is dismembered into seven pieces: a head, a torso, two legs, two arms, and a phallus. The seven ram skins that Zagreus wears are scattered to the four cardinal points in this phase.
In this phase,  is also reborn and he protects Orpheus.

Only through Orpheus's coming did the Cosmos start to function, and both the creation of the physical world and the beginning of human society were brought into existence.

This cosmic cycle was a tenfold one, with the number ten believed to represent the Cosmos because it contained four phases (in Thracian religion, the tetrad was the basis of the Cosmos) consisting of the numbers four, three, two and one, and expressed in the formula . There were therefore final two phases of the cosmic cycle:
in the ninth phase, Orpheus attains enlightenment.
in the tenth phase, Orpheus is allowed to also unite with the goddess in sacred marriage.

In revenge for not allowing them to see or participate in the mysteries reserved for men, the women of the Cicones tribe drink wine and take up the weapons of their men left at the entrance of the chamber where they were celebrating the Orphic mysteries, thus becoming Maenads possessed by divine fury, and dismember Orpheus and throw his dismembered parts in the Hebrus river. Henceforth, legend claimed that whenever 's chthonic aspect (Dionysus-Zagreus) was worshipped on this mountain, the cithara plant would resound like a lyre or cithara. After killing Orpheus, the Cicones women are marked with tattoos and their husbands returned to them, and they become the ancestresses of their clans.

The Orphic myth was a myth of sacrificial crisis and of renewal of the cosmos as well as of human creation and procreation and of the social order, characterising 's appearances to humanity in moments of social disturbance, with the social order being restored through sacrifice.

Fitting the nature of the Orphic myth as a myth of sacrificial crisis and of crisis and renewal of the cosmos as well as of human creation and procreation and of the social order, the reversion of the social order is represented by the Cicones women leaving their homes, drinking wine and taking up the weapons of men, therefore acting according to the archetype of the "Amazon". This represented a division of society into male and female halves, and might have had its origin in a ritual meant to designate the state of Chaos, that is the primordial world from before the emergence of social structures and cultural standards, where the women remained "Amazons" forever and the men disappear and become socially unnecessary because the women had taken over their functions: this represented the archaic conceptualisation of society as requiring sexual bipolarity and the constitutive power of marriage as its basis, without which it would perish. The restoring of order through sacrifice happens when the women are marked with tattoos and become their clans' ancestresses.

and the Titans
In one myth, the Titan enemies of the infant  smeared their faces with white clay and offered him a mirror, an essentially visual object. When  saw his image in the mirror, he followed it, and thus was dismembered. The Titans were then punished by being turned into ashes from which humanity was born.

The attributes of the Titans, the mirror and the mask, provided them with a common mythic space where they can meet the infant  and kill him. The role of the mirror in this myth is to confuse  and make him lose the sense of the boundary between the here and the beyond, and therefore to make him fall asleep, that is to be transported to the world beyond. Thus, the mirror reflects the dual nature of  himself, who, like the mirror, reverses everything. The role of the white clay the Titans masked their faces in the myth is to reveal their inner nature as "other," that is representatives of death: white clay itself was associated with death in Thrace, reflecting an Indo-European conceptualisation of the afterlife as a clay house. The identification of the Titans with clay, a primal matter, also reflected their nature as the world's first people. The Titans' clay masks therefore also performed the function as the mirror, that of reversing the world, and marked the mythical and ritual state of death.

This myth reflected the making of wine from the grape, and therefore depicted the killing, dismemberment, and crushing to death of the god personifying both the grape and the wine.

The Dragon-slaying myth
The Hero  ensured the preservation of the wordly order and the normal course of life by fighting the forces of evil, and therefore in myth he underwent an epic journey on a mythical road filled with danger, and where he encountered unexpected opponents which personified Chaos, destruction, evil, and death.

This mythical combat against the monster (which was similar to the Anatolian, Iranian, and Indo-Aryan myths of the fight against the Chaos-dragon) followed the motif of the ritual fight between heroes and monsters being a test of valour, and its goal was to force the Chaos-dragon to free the waters it had stopped, to return the cattle stolen by it (representations of two dragons on each side of a bull's head on a Thracian helmet from Băiceni show that the Hero's Chaos-dragon enemy was a stealer of bulls), and to free women abducted by it, that is to ensure nature's fertility, and the continuation of humanity. This journey also represented the transition of the Thracian young Thracian warrior, from adolescence to manhood, and the transition of the Thracian prince into kingship. A series of metal appliqués from the Letnitsa Treasure fully depict the struggle of  against the Chaos-dragon:
on one piece is a depiction of the three-headed Chaos-dragon
on another piece, a sea-nymph riding a hippocampus represents the freeing of the waters from the Chaos-dragon
another piece is decorated with the image of a maiden holding in her hand a mirror, which was a symbol of marriage
on another piece is a representation of the Hero receiving a bow, which was a royal insignia
the last piece depicted the Hero entering in hierogamy with the Great Goddess  herself while the vegetation goddess blesses the union

The royal investiture scenes depicting the goddess, such as the goddess  about to give a rhyton to a horseman riding towards her on the plate of the Brezovo gold ring, and the goddess walking leftwards and is followed by a horseman holding a rhyton she has just given him on the Rosovets ring, represent the Hero 's union with the Mother Goddess, an act which ensured the plentifulness of the country, but was also indispensable for him to obtain royal power. The hierogamy scene of the Letnitsa Treasure thus represented the Hero  (with whom the king was identified and an earthly substitute for) explicitly entering in a hierogamy with the Great Goddess. In this role,  possessed the attributes common to the hearth goddess throughout various Indo-European religions: she was bound to the circle of the hearth and never left the home, thus always being a maid but never a wife, and was associated to the snake, and, since the snake was the representation of the "below," therefore to the earth itself. The hearth-goddess also symbolised the continuity of the clan, which, by guaranteeing the legitimacy of the royal line and he continuity of power, was an important part of the Thracian royal customs. These various attributes together made of  the goddess of the "autochthonic principle," that is the concept of a ruler's right to rule the land he inhabited deriving from him originating from that place, which held a very important place in archaic societies such as in Thrace, was attested there by the presence of snake-shaped hearth decorations in ancient Thrace. This importance of the hearth-goddess as the embodiment of the "autochthonic principle" is reflected across various Indo-European religions in the emphasis on the hearth-goddess in the rituals through which kings would take over new territory:
according to legend, the Argive Perdiccas I used his knife to cut a circle on the floor around the hearth of the king of Lebaea before becoming king of Macedonia
whenever the Macedonian king Philip II conquered or sought to conquer a new country, he would marry its princess, that is he would ritually unite with its local personification of Hestia (the Greek hearth-goddess).

This concept of the Thracian Hero (and the Thracian king who was his substitute on Earth) obtaining royal power through uniting with the great goddess was closely similar to the Scythian custom whereby the Scythian ancestral hero  (and, by extension, his descendant the Scythian king) was believed to acquire royal power by uniting with the Scythian goddess Artimpasa, who was herself equivalent to the Thracian Great Goddess .

Therefore, another goal of the fight against the Chaos-dragon was the elevation of the Hero himself to the status of ruler, which was symbolised by the bow, which was similarly a symbol of kingship in Achaemenid Persia, and this insignia of power was given to the Hero  by the Great Goddess herself as part of his investiture.

The Golden Fleece
An important myth was that of the Golden Fleece, according to which a golden ram appears among the king's sheep as a divine favour, and is then sacrificed, after which its skin is guarded as a royal talisman: this myth symbolised the domestication of the mobile wealth, its transfer from the domain of "Hermes" to that of the hearth-goddess , and its transformation from a living being into an object. The ram itself was an animal closely associated with "Hermes", similarly to whom it was a mediator, and occupied the middle part of the Cosmos in many myths and rituals. According to ancient Greek sources, the Greek myth of the Golden Fleece likely originated in this Thracian myth.

A representation of this myth of the golden fleece is visible on the Helmet of Coțofenești, where a warrior is depicted pressing with his knee down on a fallen ram whose head he has twisted upwards with one hand, while in the other hand he holds a short sword with which the ram is to be stabbed.

Temples
Thracian temples and sanctuaries were always built in fine groves on mountain tops where the Sun would light them immediately on rising.

Sanctuaries of 
They consisted of a large rock in a sacred grove and near a spring, and worship was carried out by leaving gifts at the stone and burning resins and incenses there. In the earlier phases of Thracian religion at the end of the Bronze Age,  and her daughter were represented by two idols, with one being placed inside the other.

Under the name of Tereia,  was worshipped in a mountain near Lampsacus.

Sanctuaries of 

In the 5th century CE, Macrobius described the famous temple of "Dionysus" as being round, with a roof open at the centre so that the light of the Sun at noon would fall exactly on the altar at the centre of the sanctuary; the shape and placement of this temple clearly connected it with the solar cult. The priests of this temple were chosen exclusively from the Bessi tribe, but the temple itself initially did not belong to any single tribe, though it later became the object of inter-tribal disputes, and when the Romans took it away from the Satrae and gave it to the Odrysae, its Bessi high priest of the god, Vologases, started a rebellion.

Henceforth, legend claimed that whenever 's chthonic aspect was worshipped on this mountain, the cithara plant would resound like a lyre or cithara.

Cult

Mystery cults
The Thracian mysteries were secret chthonic cults whose teachings were based on the doctrine of the immortality of the soul as preached by Orpheus/.

Only male warriors were allowed to become initiates and participants of the Thracian mysteries, which in this aspect made them similar to the assemblies of the secret  of ancient Iranian peoples. And like the Iranian mysteries, the Thracian mysteries consisted of fertility rites and the fight against the Chaos-dragon, and were centred around immortality. Similarly to Iranian mystery cults, where Yima took only the souls of the good to Paradise, Orpheus/ was believed to welcome only good souls but not bad souls, that is he welcomed only those who had learnt the secret of immortality through initiation in the mysteries, but not the unitiated who had not gained this privilege.

The Thracian Orphic mysteries
The religious doctrine of the Thracians, that is "Thracian Orphism," was accessible only to the royalty and nobility. Therefore, the mystery cult of "Thracian Orphism," which was most often practised in the Thracian mountains, was one of the main secrets of the royal family. This mysterial knowledge was believed to be transmitted through the consumption of the sacred drink, wine, which in Thracian culture had a similar role to the role of the soma among Indo-Aryan peoples, the haoma among Iranian peoples, and the mead among Germanic and Slavic peoples. Metal phialae were used during these rites.

Since the ancient Thracians were a highly patriarchal society, the Orphic mystery cult was held in a place where only men from the warrior-aristocracy would gather, and women not only were not allowed to participate in the rites, but the very sanctuary of Orpheus was forbidden to women. The participants of the rites had to leave their weapons at the entrance before entering the hall where the Orphic mysteries were conducted, and there they were instructed into the tenets of the teachings of Orpheus. Since the mysteries were carried out in secret, little is known about the precise rituals involved during these religious ceremonies, although it is known that their essential doctrine was that of immortality and followed the myth of Orpheus, which itself was an example of the passage of man into the afterlife through the threshold of death.

The initiates of the Orphic cult, however, were almost complete opposites of the Orphic king, and it was by disciplining their bodies through abstinence and striving for spiritual self-knowledge that they sought to achieve immortality, which the Thracians believed could be attained only by a select few initiates who would rise in body and spirit to join Orpheus and remain with him eternally.

The mysteries of the Cabeiri
The mysteries of the Cabeiri, which were a variant of the Orphic mystery cult adopted by the Greeks, took the form of a hieros gamos between the god and the goddess, or the priest and the priestess, out of which was born a mysterial child (Orpheus). This sacred marriage is represented in a jug-rhyton from the Borovo Treasure:
on its upper frieze the domination of wild Nature is depicted in the form of sileni drinking wine or swinging on boughs, and satyrs pursuing maenads who are themselves intoxicated by the smell of the blood of killed animals and dancing in trance
the lower frieze instead represents civilisation and order in the form of measured dancing to the music of the flute, figures of the child Eros mixing wine with water, and the union of the god and goddess in marriage, thus subsuming their instincts in culturally-appropriate decency

The mysteries of the Cabeiri on the island of Lemnos were performed in the dialect of the Thracian language spoken by the Sintians tribe. A sanctuary to the Cabeiri was built in palace of the Odrysian king Seuthes III in his capital city of Seuthopolis.

The initiation ritual
The initiation ritual into the mystery of the Cabeiri on Samothrace consisted of the aspiring initiate pouring blood over his naked body, after which he washed himself and dressed. Then he would enter into a long windowless hall whose walls were lined with benches where the other initiates were already seated and waiting for the new initiate. The initiate would then step on a wooden platform in the centre of the hall. while a priest spoke in the liturgical "sacred Thracian dialect" of the sanctuary to describe the sacred unions of the Mother Goddess. Those present who understood the priest's words responded with an Orphic oath and vowed to keep secret the knowledge of how the gods created the world and set it in motion.

The mysteries of 

The Thracians were grieved at 's loss and mourned him as if he were dead, but on the fourth year he gathered his tribe in this cave and appeared to them in a mythical equivalent of a mysterial rite re-enacting his own birth.

Similarly to the Orphic mysteries, the participants of the cult of  gathered in a special house where only men gathered.

Cultic personnel
Among the Thracians, the Ctistae and the Kapnobatai were ascetic sects whose members were dedicated to the gods and lived celibate lives without women. These ascetics lived peacefully and were vegetarians who subsisted only on honey, milk and cheese. The Ctistae's and Capnobatae's abstention from eating any living being, not even the animals in their flocks was derived from their belief in the transmigration of souls.

The Ctistae and the Capnobatae were highly respected and lived carefree lives without any fear because they had been initiated in the secrets of the mystery cult and were the ones who organised the male-only rituals.

Temple worship
The common people of Thrace were forbidden from participating in the mystery rites held in the mountains, and were allowed to worship only in the temples.

The Thracian priests who performed the cult of  chanted hymns in a Thracian "sacred dialect" which were addressed to the various different personifications of the god, who was given many names reflecting his solar and chthonic aspects, and described his deeds in the celestial, earthly, and chthonic realms.

Orgiastic rites

The participants invoked  to inspire them by drinking wine, and once possessed by the god, they ran through the mountain meadows and forests, while carrying torches and shouting the names of the god.  himself himself was represented in these rites in the form of a god-mask, which could have animal and floral imagery, and was the ritual equivalent of mythical metamorphosis.

These rites were carried out noisily, with nocturnal dances performed to the sound of horses' hooves and Thracian and Asian music played by cymbals, drums, and flutes, and under the light of torches and in the midst of fumes from aromatic seeds dropped in fire.

Other cults
Since the ivy was a symbolic plant of the god, these altars were decorated with ivy motifs.

Festivals

The sacrifice of Zagreus
In an annual ritual held every February, a bull representing Zagreus was sacrificed and torn to pieces, and its bloody flesh, standing for Zagreus's own flesh (in his form of Zagreus,  was believed to have to suffer since he represented fertility, the rejuvenation of nature and the flowering of life), was consumed by the participants. After rituals of sacred ploughing and sowing were enacted,  was summoned through a prayer, and she was believed to bring her son back to life in the form of a ram, a he-goat, or a male black lamb, as the incarnation of the male principle renewed, and the reborn Zagreus was represented as a male youth wearing seven ram skins.

The Bendideia
The Bandideia was a festival held in honour of the goddess  and was associated with warriors and the goddess in her huntress form.

The Bendideia was also an initiation rite for young Thracian men, who during the festival showed their skills in mounted torch races. During this rite, the youth were "born" as men and warriors through the passing of burning torches from one to another. A similar custom was practised by the ancient Greeks of Athens, where horse races were held in honour of the city's patron goddess Athena during the Panathenaic Games.

The Bithynian spring festival
The Bithyni honoured the goddess  in Spring, when she was conceptualised as a huge woman spinning thread and nurturing pigs, likely because of the goddess's multi-faceted nature.

Customs

Shamanism

Shamanism was also present in Thracian religion, and is attested in the myth of the life of the Thracian Orpheus, which symbolised the initiatory process: his singing represented the use of oral transmission in archaic religion, his behaviour included aspects of gender transformation, he descended into and returned from the underworld, and his body was dismembered and the pieces thrown into a river, with his bones being more important than his flesh. The wide open eyes depicted on Thracian helmets were also symbols of inner sight which was attainable only through secret knowledge acquired by shamanistic initiation into the mysteries given to men by Orpheus/.

Symbolic representations of shamanism appear on a series of ancient Thracian helmets and biconic cups found at Agighiol and the Iron Gates. The cups are decorated with the images of horses, goats, birds, and stags. The helmets are adorned with the image of a composite creature combining the horse, goat, bird, and stag, that is the same animals depicted on the cups, and has eight legs: eight-legged creatures are inherently linked to shamans either as their helpers or foes in myths, as is seen in the form of Odin's eight-legged horse Sleipnir in Germanic mythology.

The image of a horned eagle holding a hare in its talons and a fish in its beak is another symbolic representation of the Thracian shamanistic cosmology: the eagle represents the element of the Air and the "above," the hare represents the Earth and the "middle," and the fish represents Water and the "below". This animal representation of the Cosmos might have been related to the custom among ancient Iranian peoples whereby defeated kings symbolised that they were handing over their lands to kings who defeated them by an offering of earth and water.

Divination

The altar's royal oracle was especially renowned and had a reputation for giving reliable answers on dynastic issues, and it was believed that high flames would blaze when someone predestined to be king would pour libations on the altar: the approval or rejection of a person as a ruler were believed to have been given by the "Dionysian"  himself and was in itself a form of investiture. This happened when the flames rose high over the roof of the sanctuary each time during Alexander the Great's and the father of the Roman emperor Augustus's respective visits to this temple (the latter was told by the priests that his son would become "lord of the world").

The temple itself initially did not belong to any single tribe, but it later became the object of inter-tribal disputes, and when the Romans took it away from the Satrae and gave it to the Odrysians, its Bessi high priest, Vologases, started a rebellion.

Song and dance
The ancient Thracians had a rich epic tradition which embodied their historical memory and ideas in a mythical form, and which were handed down in the form of song and dance to help the people remember the story. This is reflected in myth by how Orpheus was depicted as an incomparable singer because his cultural reform was codified in chanted poems similar to the Greek Iliad.

This use of song and dance by the Thracians to preserve their historical, ideological, and religious beliefs is attested by how the high priests of the Getae welcomed the Macedonian army by singing and playing lyres, the Scytho-Thracian Agathyrsi memorised their laws in the form of chants, and Thracian healers used incantations as a cure for the soul.

Therefore, the Thracians' Greek neighbours associated them so strongly with song that Greek myth described Thrace as a country from which hailed great musicians and singers such as Linus, Orpheus, Thamyris, and Musaeus.

Animal sacrifice
Therefore, in an annual ritual held every February, a bull representing  was sacrificed and torn to pieces, and its bloody flesh, standing for 's own flesh, was consumed by the participants. After rituals of sacred ploughing and sowing were enacted,  was summoned through a prayer, and she was believed to bring her son back to life in the form of a ram, a he-goat, or a male black lamb, as the incarnation of the male principle renewed, and the reborn Zagreus was represented as a male youth wearing seven ram skins.

Like their Scythian neighbours, the Thracians practised horse sacrifices to the "Arean" , to present kings as victors, or as pledges to the god in exchange of his protection. These horse sacrifices also find parallels among the ancient Indo-Aryans in the form of the Ashvamedha ritual, and similarly to how the Purushamedha human sacrifice was an alternative to the Ashvamedha horse sacrifice among the Indo-Aryans, the horse could be substituted by a human in the Thracian sacrificial rite.

Representations of the horse sacrifice and its substitutability with human sacrifice are found in Thracian art in the plaques from the Letnitsa Treasure, where horse and human heads are represented behind the mounted warrior-god /the Thracian Hero.

Human sacrifice
The Getae believed that  allowed himself to be contacted only through a messenger who had been selected by drawing lots every five years, that is a messenger chosen by  himself. The role of this messenger was to act as a substitute of the king, and maybe of  himself, and he was then ritually sacrificed by being tossed on the points of three spears held by several men. However, if the messenger survived, he was believed to be unworthy of addressing , and consequently was condemned to live the rest of his life in disgrace. A similar custom existed among ancient Iranian peoples, where spears were thrown at the messenger to sacrifice him. During this ritual, the messenger was a sacred king (the ritual killing of a sacral king was widespread in the ancient world), and death itself was the gateway which separated humans from the gods: and the messenger could only cross this gateway and achieve immortality by dying on the three spearheads, thus representing the hope of every Thracian to join .

The Thracians propitiated the "Arean"  with human sacrifice, just like their Scythian neighbours who performed human sacrifices to their own god of war.

Human sacrifices to the "Arean"  were also performed to present kings as victors, or as pledges to the god in exchange of his protection. These human sacrifices also find parallels among the ancient Indo-Aryans in the form of the Purushamedha ritual, and similarly to how the Ashvamedha horse sacrifice was an alternative to the Purushamedha human sacrifice among the Indo-Aryans, the human could be substituted by a horse in the Thracian sacrificial rite.

Representations of the human sacrifice and its substitutability with horse sacrifice are found in Thracian art in the plaques from the Letnitsa Treasure, where horse and human heads are represented behind the mounted warrior-god /the Thracian Hero.

The king of the Caeni tribe, Diegylis, while going to celebrate a wedding, once captured two young Greeks from the kingdom of Attalus II, garlanded them like sacrificial animals, led them to his royal palace, declared that his sacrifice could not be the same as that of the common people, and sacrificed them in his royal palace. while the attendees praised his skill and sang a paean.

Storm fight
During thunderstorms, the Getae would shoot arrows aimed at the thunder and the lightning into the sky. This ritual fight was connected to the Thracian myth of 's struggle against the Chaos-dragon, especially in how it paralleled the Indo-Iranian dragon-slaying myth, according to which ancient Indo-Aryans shot arrows at the rain clouds personifying the Chaos-dragon during festivities, and the Iranian god Mithra defeated the dragon by shooting it with an arrow.

Calendar
The Bithyni, who were a Thracian tribe settled in Asia Minor, named a month of their calendar after .

Decision-making
When the Bithyni would take decisions on important issues, they would sit facing the Sun so that the god, who was believed to be all-seeing and all-hearing, would predict their fate.

Judgement
The Bithyni would hold their tribunals in the open air under the Sun to their belief that the solar-god, who was a guarantor and supervisor of the world order, would control the rightfulness of their decisions.

Other customs
Thracian and Paeonian women sent their offerings to the goddess  wrapped in straw.

Thracian warriors used to decorate their helmets and shields with ivy during religious festivals.

Warrior customs

Warrior initiation
In Thracian society, the boy's duty was that he was to become a warrior, and accordingly this transition from boyhood to manhood was marked by an initiation process during which determining events of the utmost importance would take place. The incidents of the mystical initiation rite, at the end of which the young man acquired the status of a mature member of society, were not linear and gradual, and instead each life stage was believed to correspond to a stage of the cycle of the year, whose end was denoted by ritual death. Thus, these events were dramatic and followed an accelerated rhythm during which the young man's life might have been in danger.

Gender transformation
Although the boy was physically male, he had socially not yet become a man, and therefore he had held the position of a "woman" within male society before his initiation. Therefore, the initiate young man, symbolised by the Thracian Hero, was represented beardless during his transition to manhood to mark his "femininity," as well as to show his youth and his status as an initiate, since the beard was the standard denotation of male status in Thracian society, the Thracian Hero was depicted as beardless. The Thracian warrior's initiation was an irreversible transformation that entailed going through a series of trials and solving riddles, and was associated with the mythical concept of the road full of danger which begins in one cultural state and reaches another one through crossing wild nature, and along which the Hero encountered unexpected foes personifying the forces of Chaos, destruction, evil, and death. 

In practical terms, the initiation consisted of the initiate young man and his tutor living by violence and plunder in wild nature, far from other people. The young Thracian warriors during this period of initiation were half-outsiders, and this status was represented in sexual transformations whereby the initiate young man was treated as a woman by the adult warriors in the form of a homosexual relationship between the new warrior and his tutor. In Thracian art, this ambivalence in the initiate's gender is represented on a vase from the Rogozen Treasure by hunters who have long braided hair like that of the goddess . In Greek mythological retellings, the Thracian initiation process is recorded in the form of the heroine Harpalyce, who, like all warrior-heroes, has only one parent, her father Harpalycus, who trained her to hunt and fight like she were a boy; that these two figures had the same name meant that their relationship was in fact not a father-daughter one, but one between a "father" lover-tutor and a "woman" beloved-neophyte.

Animalistic transformation
The Thracian initiate warrior also experienced a symbolic animalistic transformation in addition to gender transformation:
during their initiation, the Thracian warriors lived as hunters in the wilderness, where they survived by plunder, poaching and theft, and they killed, attacked at night and risked being caught and killed themselves, they violated the social laws and became outlaws, who in Indo-European traditions are symbolised by the wolf
like the wolf, the hero-warrior was conceptualised as a lone hunter who also acted as a member of a group, attacked at night and in winter, lived outside human society, and sometimes disguised himself as an actual wolf
thus the Thracian hero was linked to a notion of wolf and antagonist

The Thracian initiate warrior, thus, during his transition to manhood, was an outsider inhabited the realm of "nature," that is the animal realm, in opposition to the realm of culture or of "man," that is the community of kinship. The wolves were also the symbol of the young initiate warrior-hero because the wolf was associated with initiation in Thracian culture. Thus, the half-outsider status of the young Thracian warriors was also represented in animal transformations. In addition to the wolf, the bear, an animal representing strangeness and alienation in Thracian culture, also represented the young warrior during his initiation. The third creature the initiate warrior was associated with was the centaur, who constituted a non-individualised all-male group with a common name, thus representing a ritual community, such as an initiation group of young warriors. This connection with the centaur, which was an animalistic identification similar to the dog and wolf emblems, arose from the Indo-European association of the horse with the god of war, the warrior class, and the military aristocracy. Thracian warrior initiates were taught to ride, and were associated with the horse, which was their emblematic animal. The association between young men and horses itself was derived from the cult of the Divine twins (who are attested as the Ashvins in India and the Dioscuri in Greece, and to whom might have been connected the double image of the Hero  during the boar hunt), who are connected to the horse. In mythology the hero is usually born at the same time as his horse, and young men who had been initiated at the same time were considered "brothers" or "twins" because they were socially "born" together. Out of this connection between the man and the horse arose the myth of the dual-natured centaur.

The young warrior-hero was symbolised by asymmetry (this heroic asymmetry represented a direct opposition to the symmetry of social order), being one-armed, one-legged, and one-eyed, but sometimes simply represented as left-handed, with this heroic asymmetry in turn representing the transition from adolescence to adulthood, when a young man was initiated into the warrior class but his status had not been solidified yet. Accordingly, some depictions of young heroes in Thrace show them holding the spear in their left hand, which denoted the youths as being "to the left," which is to say, wild or immature; this iconography might have been derived from older symbolisms which used spatial symbolism to represent the "right" and "wrong" social roles. This asymmetry was also represented by the depiction of only one leg: silver greaves found in Thracian tombs were meant only for the left leg, meaning only the left leg was decorated with this piece of armour. Accordingly, the Greek myths relating to Thrace referred to the legendary Edoni king Lycurgus as "one-legged," in accordance to the asymmetrical nature of the hero.

The trial of the hunt
The major trial the Thracian warrior initiate had to go through to complete his initiation involved hunting, which was the most commonly depicted form of trial in Thracian art and was a sacred act for the Thracians, hence why all young Thracians irrespective of gender were depicted as hunters during their initiation. Therefore, the Thracian Hero was commonly depicted as a mounted hunter whose opponents included the lion, the bear, the wolf, and the panther, all animals whose hunting skills the initiates could learn from. Thus, their defeat by the hunter brought him glory and the animal's powers passed on to him, but if the pretender lost the fight against the beast, he would lose his life and his dynasty would end. The hunt, in Thracian myth, codified the inherently conflicting opposition between animal and man, carnivorous and herbivorous, wild and domesticated, and nature and culture, and therefore was a metaphor for transition. Thus, the youth overcomes the "wild" and brings both it and himself into civilisation, and by killing it, he joins society: there was no way back on the road from adolescence to manhood and the only direction the initiate could move was forward, and it was by successfully fulfilling the trial of the hunt that the initiate finally became a man; however, if he failed, the young man was condemned to remain on the road leading from adolescence to manhood forever and would usually be killed and not be reborn as a man. A similar custom was present among the Thracians' Macedonian neighbours, according to which a youth gained the right to sit with adults at feasts only after defeating a boar with his bare hands, and both Thracian and Macedonian art depicted hunters on horseback, denoting the hunt as an aristocratic tradition. In the myth of Harpalyce, this was reflected by how she a skilled huntress was able to avoid traps with great agility and cunning, and was captured only when the members of her tribe used her own traps against her.

Completion of the initiation
The gender transformation of the initiate was also present in the ritual temporary death which marked completion of the young Thracian warrior's initiation, after which he was reborn into a new status, since the boy could only be reborn as a man and warrior after crossing the gateway into the afterlife. This transition in social status was itself represented in Thracian myth by the violent death of the hero by dismemberment, burning, and devouring, commonly at the hands of a terrifying monster. In ritual it involved the act of tying down using a net (the youth's typical hunting weapon, and an attribute of initiation), as reflected in the myth of Harpalyce, where she traps her prey in nets and eventually dies after being caught in the nets of her father's subjects. This connection between the act of tying and the warrior function in Thracian religion is visible in the name of the goddess , who was a patron of initiation and warriors in her form as a spinner or a huntress with nets, and whose name was derived from the Indo-European root , meaning "to bind".

During the initiation rite of the Bendideia, which was held in honour of the goddess  and was associated with warriors and the goddess in her huntress form, young men in Thrace showed their skills in mounted torch races. During this rite, the youth were "born" as men and warriors through the passing of burning torches from one to another. A similar custom was practised by the ancient Greeks of Athens, where horse races were held in honour of the city's patron goddess Athena during the Panathenaic Games.

Once the Thracian warrior's initiation was completed, he was offered a belt to mark its fulfilment.

The warrior and the wolf
Due to the association of the wolf with the warrior-god, wolves and dogs were symbols of war in ancient Thrace, and Thracians performed rituals associated with those animals during war, with the wolf representing the outsider enemies. The wolf was therefore often represented in Thracian art as a symbol of warriors.

An early mention by the Thracians' Greek neighbours of the connection with between the Thracian warrior and the wolf is featured in the Iliad, where the Thracian scout Dolon disguised himself as a wolf before to spy the Achaeans. Due to this connection with the wolf, the Greeks ascribed to the country of the Thracians a number of heroes whose names were derived from the word , meaning "wolf," such as Lycurgus and Harpalyce. Just like Harpalyce, who represented a wolf, another Thracian heroine, Polyphonte, was represented as a bear, which was another symbolic animal of the warrior.

Hairstyle
Similarly to the wolf's mane, distinctive hairstyles and beards were attributes of warriors in Thrace, with Homer recording that the Thracian Abantes wore their hair piled high on their heads, and Plutarch ascribing this custom to the Thracians' warlike nature. This hairstyle is attested in Thracian art in the form of the topknot of the hero depicted in the Letnitsa Treasure. Hairstyle had further significance among the Thracian aristocracy, that is the warrior class, whom Athenaeus described as "uncombed," and several pieces of Thracian artwork depict heroes as having curly hair. This reflects the role of hair braiding as a form of initiation among Indo-European military societies which was so important that their members were sometimes named after these hairstyles, which is attested among Indo-Iranian peoples in the form of the Iranian  and the Indian .

The warrior and light
Since the Thracian aristocracy, that is the warrior class, were the only ones to have been initiated into the secret knowledge of immortality by Orpheus/, and knowledge was associated with light, which was itself seen as a sign of divine mission, the Thracian heroic kings were defined as light or described as "bright and luminous," and the Thracian aristocrats were called zibythides, meaning "bright".

Gendered punishments
The punishment the Dacians king Oroles imposed on his warriors who had shown cowardice in battle against the Bastarnae was connected to the gender transformation of the warriors: he ordered them to reverse their sleeping position by sleeping with their heads placed where they normally put their feet on their beds, and to perform for their wives the chores their wives had previously carried out for them, thus showing them that they had behaved "like women" in battle by subordinating them to the lower status of their women. This punishment remained in place until the Dacian warriors had wiped out this humiliation by valour in battle. Thus, after having failed the duties of manhood in war, each warrior had to undergo the social inversion of the roles of man and woman, and therefore assume the place and functions of a woman.

Royal customs
The Thracian king was assimilated to the Hero  and was his substitute on Earth. Hence, he was considered to be responsible for order and abundance in the world, of which the most important rituals were the divine marriage with the Great Goddess and the hunt. However, there were more customs and rituals which were attached to kingship.

The royal oracle
This happened when the flames rose high over the roof of the sanctuary each time during Alexander the Great's and the father of the Roman emperor Augustus's respective visits to this temple (the latter was told by the priests that his son would become "lord of the world").

The temple itself initially did not belong to any single tribe, but it later became the object of inter-tribal disputes, and when the Romans took it away from the Satrae and gave it to the Odrysians, its Bessi high priest, Vologases, started a rebellion.

The royal initiation
Since the kings in archaic Indo-European societies such as the Thracians were from the warrior class, the royal customs originated from the customs of military initiation. However, kingship in Indo-European societies also united the functions of the threefold Indo-European class system: the priestly, military, and agricultural classes. Therefore, in addition to being military leaders, the Thracian kings were also landowners and priest-kings, with the supremacy of the Thracian rulers being based on the dual principle of the priest-king.

Therefore, the warrior initiation an important part of the Thracian royal customs, most especially the trial of the hunt, and both Thracian and Macedonian art depicted hunters on horseback, denoting the hunt as an aristocratic tradition. Hence, the Thracian Hero was commonly depicted as a mounted hunter whose opponents included the lion, the bear, the wolf, and the panther, all animals considered to be "royal" and whose hunting skills the initiates could learn from; thus, their defeat by the hunter brought him glory and the animal's powers passed on to him. The main rival of a Thracian prince aspiring to be king was the wild boar, who held a special symbolic status and represented the Indo-European god of war since, like the wild warrior initiate, it was an undifferentiated animal, being both herbivorous and predatory, land-dwelling but preferring marshes and swamps, and therefore a borderline creature existing at the threshold of the wild and the domesticated, which made it a fitting symbol of Chaos, where all attributes and qualities are undifferentiated. The boar was also a symbol of death, and therefore the struggle between the animal and the Hero represented the struggle to protect life itself, that is the life of the people, the prince, and the royal line. The hunt was therefore, for Thracian princes, not only a trial of initiation, but also one of consecration, and if they failed it they would die and never become king. and their dynasty would end.

The royal investiture
Once the Thracian king had completed his initiation and trials, he was given insignia of power visible on depictions of royal investiture, which were themselves derived from Near Eastern artistic motifs depicting the investiture of kings. All these investiture scenes have the same common theme: the prince becomes a king only by the god's will:
a representation of the royal investiture is visible on the plate of the Brezovo gold ring, where the goddess  is represented about to give a rhyton to a horseman towards her
on the Rosovets ring, the goddess is walking leftwards and is followed by a horseman holding a rhyton she has just given him
on a greave from Agighiol, a warrior is represented offering a rhyton and an eagle to a horseman who has already received a bow
the shamanistic imagery of the eagle holding a hare in its talons and a fish in its beak and offering them to another eagle is a zoomorphic repreentation of the investiture, with the hare and the fish being symbols of kingship, corresponding to the Iranian political practice of a defeated king having to offer earth and water to his victor
the depiction of an eagle with a snake in its beak has a similar meaning

During these scenes of royal investiture, the king usually undergoes apotheosis: the king is represented seated on a throne, and holding the royal insignias, which include a bow, a phiale and a rhyton. The throne itself was an attribute of power, and ascending to it contained a motif of conflict: similarly to how the Hittites identified the royal throne with their own Chaos-dragon, the Thracians identified the defeat of the Chaos-dragon with the act of ascending the throne. Representations of this identification are present in Thracian art, such as on a Thracian helmet from Băiceni, where, on one cheekpiece, a snake is depicted coiled under the throne upon which is seated the Hero, who holds a cup and a rhyton in his raised hands and a bow hangs behind his back; and on the other cheekpiece, two dragons are represented on each side of a bull's head, meaning that the Hero's Chaos-dragon enemy was a stealer of bulls. As part of the royal insignia, the bow or the spear represented the warrior function: in Thrace, the bow was the typical weapon of the young warrior and part of the royal insignia given to the prince after he defeated his opponent in the re-enactment of the struggle between the Hero (to whom the king was assimilated) and the Chaos-monster (in myth, the gods' enemies could only be defeated once the hero had joined the fight wielding his bow). The use of the bow as royal insignia was also present among the Iranian peoples, such as the Scythians and the Persians, who hunted using the bow, while it rarely figured on Thracian depictions of hunting scenes. Among the Thracians, the mastery of the bow was necessary for kingship, and the king Cotys I displayed this skill of his to his servants during his symbolic marriage to the goddess Athena. The libation cup, that is the rhyton and the phiale which were used in the royal cult, represented the king's priestly function, and hence held a mediating function (the libation cup was also a symbol held by the king among the Greeks), but were also signifiers of social status. Thus, in Thrace as well as Scythia and the Near East, the royal insignia included the cup and the bow, the possession of which had a symbolic meaning.

Additional attributes of kingship included pieces of armour, especially the belt, which was given to Indo-European warriors a marker of their completed initiation, and was therefore called "wolf-like" and hence Thracian belt-buckles were decorated with images showing their ritual function: they were sometimes designed in the shape of a wolf figure, or modelled in an openwork technique to look like an animal figure, or feature scenes representing the royal customs.

The royal divine marriage
The royal investiture scenes depicting the goddess, such as the goddess  about to give a rhyton to a horseman riding towards her on the plate of the Brezovo gold ring, and the goddess walking leftwards and is followed by a horseman holding a rhyton she has just given him on the Rosovets ring, represent the Hero 's (assimilated in these with the king) union with the Mother Goddess, an act which ensured the plentifulness of the country, but was also indispensable for him to obtain royal power. This ritual union between the king and the Goddess thus paralleled the hierogamy scene of the Letnitsa Treasure representing the Hero  (with whom the king was identified and an earthly substitute for) explicitly entering in a hierogamy with the Great Goddess. In this role,  possessed the attributes common to the hearth goddess throughout various Indo-European religions: she was bound to the circle of the hearth and never left the home, thus always being a maid but never a wife, and was associated to the snake, and, since the snake was the representation of the "below," therefore to the earth itself. The hearth-goddess also symbolised the continuity of the clan, which, by guaranteeing the legitimacy of the royal line and he continuity of power, was an important part of the Thracian royal customs. These various attributes together made of  the goddess of the "autochthonic principle," that is the concept of a ruler's right to rule the land he inhabited deriving from him originating from that place, which held a very important place in archaic societies such as in Thrace, was attested there by the presence of snake-shaped hearth decorations in ancient Thrace. This importance of the hearth-goddess as the embodiment of the "autochthonic principle" is reflected across various Indo-European religions in the emphasis on the hearth-goddess in the rituals through which kings would take over new territory:
according to legend, the Argive Perdiccas I used his knife to cut a circle on the floor around the hearth of the king of Lebaea before becoming king of Macedonia
whenever the Macedonian king Philip II conquered or sought to conquer a new country, he would marry its princess, that is he would ritually unite with its local personification of Hestia (the Greek hearth-goddess).

A depiction of the ritual divine marriage is the mural of the Thracian Tomb of Kazanlak, in which the deceased chieftain, having already been deified and become an anthropodaemon, is seated at a table with food on it and holds a phiale in one hand while his other hand is tenderly placed under that of his wife, who is seated on a throne next to him. The phiale he holds in his hand was a symbol of investiture, and which therefore linked the hierogamy with the royal investiture.

By standing for the Hero  in the divine hierogamy, the king also took over the role of the tribal progenitor, as demonstrated by how, after Lysimachus had been captured by the king of the Getae, Dromichaetes, the latter arranged a feast for him and placed before him sumptuous vessels on silver tables, and called Lysimachus "father" in a speech to him.

Another example of the Thracian belief in the rite of the sacred marriage with the goddess was in how the Odrysian king Cotys I believed that Athena accepted to be a substitute for the Great Goddess as his spouse. This most unusual ritual union with the goddess happened when the Odrysian king Cotys I believed the Greek goddess Athena had agreed to marry him, and therefore he arranged a wedding feast and prepared a bridal chamber where he waited for his divine bride after getting drunk. During this ritual marriage between the king and the goddess, Cotys was the earthly substitute for the Hero , making him the lover of the goddess, who in this case was the Mother Goddess of Athens: the ritual echoed the myth of the marriage of the hero Tereus with the Athenian princesses Procne and Philomela to express his desire to possess Athena, but in Cotys's case it was the goddess herself who replaced the two princesses. This ceremony was a reflection of Cotys's policy of expelling the Athenians from Aegean Thrace, of which further evidence exists in his declaration to the Athenians who had granted him honorary citizenship to their city that he too would grant them his tribe's rights, so he could this way put the Odrysian kingdom and Athens on an equal footing. Cotys's ritual marriage to Athena in her role as the Athenian form of the Great Goddess is paralleled by the many diplomatic and likely ritual marriages of the Macedonian king Philip II, which he always contracted during war time with the daughter of a king whose lands he had conquered or was planning to conquer:
Philip first married the Illyrian princess Audata and with her had a daughter named Cynane
then wedded Phila of Elimeia, the sister of the Archon Derdas III of Elimiotis
Philip then fathered children with two Thessalian women to attract the Thessalians' support
from his marriage to Olympias, he obtained the kingdom of the Molossians in dowry
when he conquered Thrace, the king Cothelas went to meet him bearing gifts, including his daughter Meda, whom Philip married
finally, he fell in love with Cleopatra Eurydice niece of Attalus
These many marriages were analogous to that of Pallene and Cleitus, and were contracted out of the belief that ritual union with the Mother Goddess, that is the daughter of a royal family, was necessary to validate the new king's rule over her land.

Treasure burial
One of the most important royal rituals among the Thracians was the burial of sacred treasure, which represented the hearth-goddess , who was the goddess of the centre of things, the home, the proper, the familiar, and of wealth. The burial of the treasure symbolising the goddess therefore created a centre for a specific area, and therefore constituted the appropriation and "familiarisation" of this territory. The ritual of burying and finding the treasure represented a sacred marriage between the king and the hearth-goddess, and by this act, the king legitimised his power over his own territories or his new conquests, and renewed his royal privileges. This ritual was connected to the hearth-goddess's role as the embodiment of the "autochthonic principle," whose importance is reflected across various Indo-European religions by the emphasis on the hearth-goddess in the rituals through which kings would take over new territory:
according to legend, the Argive Perdiccas I used his knife to cut a circle on the floor around the hearth of the king of Lebaea before becoming king of Macedonia
whenever the Macedonian king Philip II conquered or sought to conquer a new country, he would marry its princess, that is he would ritually unite with its local personification of Hestia (the Greek hearth-goddess)

The priest-king
The institution of the high priest-king, within whom both religious and political power had been merged, was present throughout all the Thracian peoples and tribes:
 The chieftains of the Scaeii and the Cebrenii were priests of "Hera" (that is the goddess )
 The Orysian king Cotys I was similarly a king-high priest
 The Odrysuab king Seuthes II's feast as described by Xenophon had all the trappings of a sacrificial ritual carried out in a hall built specifically for such a purpose, thus attesting to Seuthes's position as a king-high priest
 The king of the Caeni tribe, Diegylis, while going to celebrate a wedding, once captured two young Greeks from the kingdom of Attalus II, garlanded them like sacrificial animals, led them to his royal palace, declared that his sacrifice could not be the same as that of the common people, and sacrificed them in his royal palace. while the attendees praised his skill and sang a paean
 At Seuthopolis, the Odrysian king Seuthes III, the sanctuary of the Cabeiri was an important part of the royal palace and it contained one of the largest cult fireplaces of the city. This sanctuary is the material evidence of the function of the king-high priest which is mentioned in both mythological and historical literary sources
 At the time of the Dacians king Burebista, one Deceneus visited Egypt and learned about magic there. When Deceneus returned to the Dacians, he began to consider himself as a god, just like . In Dacia, Burebista received Deceneus and invested him with quasi-total royal power. When Deceneus died, the respect the Dacians held for him passed on to Comosicus, who was Deceneus's equal in title and was respected by the Dacians because he was both high priest and king. And when Comosicus died, Scorilo succeeded him. This order of historical events paralleled the myth of  going to Egypt to learn wisdom and being made co-ruler or high priest by the king when he returned to the Getae. Deceneus himself was part of an institution of dual kingship of the Dacians, and after him the dual power was transferred to Comosicus alone, and after Comosicus to Scorilo alone. Thus, the mythological and historical aspects of royalty had become one and the same among the Dacians too, and the king-high priest and god-king  became a model of royal power

The functions of Thracian kingship
The role of the Thracian kingship as a tripartite structure uniting the synthesis of the military, priestly and agriculturalist functions is reflected in Greek myths referring to Thrace. In one Greek myth, Charops founded the Dionysian dynasty of Thrace through war, representing the military function; Charops's successor, Oeagrus, was a lonely hunter, representing the agricultural function; Oeagrus's successor, Orpheus, was a poet who founded mystery cults and was a religious reformer, therefore personifying the priestly function. In another Greek myth, the first Edoni king, Rhesus, who possessed magical weapons and was killed during the Trojan War, represented the warrior-king; his brother Olynthus died during a lion hunting trial (which in the myth stood for a sacrificial rite) and his death sanctified the place where a city was to be built, and therefore represented the priestly function; the third brother, Brangas, founded a prosperous city, and represented the agriculturalist role. The first two brothers, Rhesus and Olynthus, respectively represented the opposites of "nature" and "culture," which was reflected in how a river in the Troad was named after Rhesus while the city built by Brangas was named after Olynthus.

A material representation of the tripartite function of Thracian kingship was the dowry that the Odrysian king Cotys I gave his daughter, and which consisted of a gold shield (representing the military function, with its symbolic role being accentuated by the precious metal it was made of), two precious cups and two herds of white horses (representing the priestly function), and a bushel of millet and an underground storeroom filled with onions and a flock of goats (representing the agricultural function), and a "multi-legged hecatomb".

Royal brightness
Since the Thracian aristocracy, that is the warrior class, were the only ones to have been initiated into the secret knowledge of immortality by Orpheus/, and knowledge was associated with light, which was itself seen as a sign of divine mission, the Thracian heroic kings were defined as light or described as "bright and luminous". Therefore, the rightful king was chosen in a rite called the "fiery investiture," which was linked to the Indo-European conceptualisation of the lighting of fire as signalling the ruler's social "birth," and which finds parallels among the Indo-Iranian peoples, such as the Iranian khvarenah, and the Scythian royal insignia (the hestiai of ) which fell from the sky. Hence, Thracian helmets of precious metals were associated to the concept of a glowing light around the head of the sacred ruler, similarly to how the khvarenah was believed to take the form of a golden helmet among Iranian peoples. Since Fire was considered a solar element by the Thracians, it was therefore religiously associated with the Sun. Sunrise was also identified with the lighting of fire, and therefore the sacred king was believed to be "born" with the sunrise. This solar association had parallels among other Indo-European culture: among Celtic peoples, there was a rule dictating that the king had to wake up before sunrise; and the contests of the pretenders to the throne of the Persian Achaemenid Empire were held at sunrise. The "fiery investiture," also called the "solar investiture," was another iteration of this solar-royal association, and Thracian kings were considered to be all-seeing as the Sun, and therefore gazing at the ruler-Sun was taboo and was believed to cause blindness. Thracian royal properties were also usually marked using fire, gold and light. The wide open eyes depicted on Thracian helmets represented the conceptualisation of the ruler as all-seeing like the Sun, but were also symbols of inner sight which was attainable only through secret knowledge acquired by shamanistic initiation into the mysteries given to men by Orpheus/.

Divine ancestry
Since the Thracian kings were assimilated to the divine Hero, who in Thracian mythology was the son of a deity, they therefore claimed divine ancestry: in the myth of the Hero , once he had defeated the Chaos-dragon, he entered in hierogamy with the goddess , through which the god and the goddess the divine granters of royal power to the kings. Hence, the mythological origin of royal dynasties was based on the attribution of a divine origin to royal power, and was the basis on which members of the royal dynasty were named:
the founder of the kingdom of the Odrysians, Teres I, was named after the nymph or goddess Tereine, who was connected to the goddess Tereia, that is a local reflex of the Great Goddess  who was worshipped in a mountain near Lampsacus
the name of Teres's son, Sitalces, was related to one of the epithets of 
the king Cotys, whose own name was derived from that of the goddess Kottyto, was called "son of Apollo" in an inscription
's son, in turn, would rule the land conquered by his father, being thus a representation of the idea of the divine origin of the ruler. The etymology of royal names, the ritual nature of the royal hunt, and the practice of ritual union with the Mother Goddess are thus evidence that the Thracian kings took over the functions of the Hero  in the human realm, and the kings therefore patterned their actions on the divine Hero.

The royal feast
The Thracian kings exhibited their power through royal feasts to which only notables were invited, and every Thracian royal ceremony included a sumptuous feast, which was an important ritual of Thracian social life.

The guests of the royal feasts were members of a limited circle, and being invited to a royal feast was considered a special privilege: participating in the royal feast was considered a privilege among Thracians, and, just as among the Persians, Scythians, and Macedonians, an institution of "table companions" existed in Thrace whose members consisted of Thracian and foreign nobility, close relatives of the royal family, particularly brave warriors, and other distinguished individuals; Cotys I invited only high officials to his banqueting halls; and Seuthes II summoned only the most eminent of his people and promised to Xenophon that he would make the Greeks his brothers and boon companions if they were to help him. Important political, military, social, diplomatic, and administrative issues were discussed during the feasts, whose participants were entertained by clowns and musicians, and which usually ended with a dance by the king himself (Seuthes was the first to get up to dance at his feasts). The Thracian royal feasts were splendid and lavish events. For example, during the wedding of Cotys I's daughter to Iphicrates, the city square was carpeted with purple, the feast was attended by dishevelled "fat-gobbling" men, and there were copper cauldrons larger than a room for twelve beds. Cotys himself served the food and wine, ladling soup out of a gold vessel, and he had become inebriated before his guests from tasting the wine in the mixing bowls, reflecting the role of the king as the dispenser of food to his subjects. Similarly, Seuthes II in this role used to take the bread and meat laid out before him, break them, and then throw the pieces to his guests as he deemed fit, and during his feasts, his guests sat in a circle while he distributed the food and wine. This role of the king is also attested in the myth of Maron, who jealously guarded his wine and himself offered it to his guests.

According to Xenophon, during Seuthes's banquet, a Thracian arrived leading a white horse, took a full horn and drank to Seuthes, and presented the horse; another Thracian brought a young slave and, similarly, drank to Seuthes and offered him the slave; a third Thracian again drank to Seuthes and offered him garments for his queen; Timasion of Dardanus also drank to Seuthes and offered him a silver cup and a carpet worth ten minas. The preciousness of the gifts and the pouring of libations at the feast meant that this ceremony was also a ritual of deifying either the king himself or the institution of royalty, and Thucydides was likely referring to this custom when he wrote that noting could be accomplished among the Odrysians without gift-giving. Seuthes's feast as described by Xenophon had all the trappings of a sacrificial ritual carried out in a hall build specifically for such a purpose, thus attesting of Seuthes's position as a king-high priest.

Royal sacrifices
The images of horse and human heads suspended behind the backs of horsemen on appliqués from the Letnitsa Treasure attest of the existence of regular human and equine sacrifices to the "Arean"  meant to present the Thracian kings as victors. These sacrifices, which are recorded in Graeco-Roman sources, find parallels among Indo-Iranian peoples, such as the Ashvamedha and Purushamedha sacrifices practised by the ancient Indo-Aryans, and similar sacrifices practised by the Scythians. In Thracian art, the figure of the Greek goddess Nike offering a wreath to a victor while standing on a quadriga was used to represent the victorious ruler.

The king of the Caeni tribe, Diegylis, while going to celebrate a wedding, once captured two young Greeks from the kingdom of Attalus II, garlanded them like sacrificial animals, led them to his royal palace, declared that his sacrifice could not be the same as that of the common people, and sacrificed them in his royal palace. while the attendees praised his skill and sang a paean.

The royal tour
Among the rituals performed by the Thracian kings to renew their power, the king's tour of the lands he ruled was a common one. Since Thracian kings had multiple residences located at cult centres instead of a permanent capital, they visited each residence regularly, and the kingdom's territorial model was re-enacted and the social Cosmos was restructured on each visit. Whenever foreign guests visited the kings of the kingdom of the Odrysians, they had to accompany him on this ritual tour, which for the most part consisted of visiting settlements located in southeastern Thrace, around the "sacred mountain" which was the religious centre of the kingdom and the location of the kings' treasury. A representation of this ritual tour might be found on Derrones coins depicting a king sitting on an ox-driven cart while an eagle holding prey in its talons is above him, as a royal omen of divine patronage.

Horse ownership
Thracians considered white horses to be symbols of the divine origin of the Hero and the ruler. Therefore, their ownership was part of the royal customs, and is attested by how, in myth, the horses of Rhesus, described as "whiter than the feathers of the river swan," and by the two herds of white horses that Cotys gave to his daughter as dowry. Connected to this custom might be how the Thracians stole the sacred chariot of "Zeus" harnessed with eight horses that the Persian king Darius I had left with the Paeonians for safekeeping: the Thracians might have considered that chariot as a symbol of their Hero, or maybe their king took over it because he saw it as a traditional insignia of power.

The hunt
The hunt, which in Thrace was customarily carried out on horseback, held the status of being a test of valour for kings, therefore being a ritual character as part of the royal customs. The royal residence probably had reserves to provide supplies for the royal hunt, as is suggested by Plutarch's record of Cotys offering a lion to someone who had gifted him a panther.

The hunt more generally was royal privilege among the Mycenaeans, the Thracians, and the peoples of Western Asia and was therefore part of the iconography of heroes: heroes were represented fighting real animals or mythical creatures in Hittite, Assyrian, and Achaemenian and Egyptian art, in which the hunt was also a popular theme. Thus, in this aspect the Thracians were closer to the ancient cultures of ancient Western Asia and North Africa, which is reflected in the Odrysian king Teres I's declaration that he did not feel different from his grooms when he was idle and not engaged in war, which echoes the words of Atys son of Croesus that it was a "great and noble pleasure" for him and his father to warring and hunting when he persuaded his father to allow him to go on a boar hunt.

Gift-giving
Thucydides was likely referring to the following custom, detailed by Xenophon and carried during feasts, when he wrote that noting could be accomplished among the Odrysians without gift-giving: during Seuthes II's banquet, a Thracian arrived leading a white horse, took a full horn and drank to Seuthes, and presented the horse; another Thracian brought a young slave and, similarly, drank to Seuthes and offered him the slave; a third Thracian again drank to Seuthes and offered him garments for his queen; Timasion of Dardanus also drank to Seuthes and offered him a silver cup and a carpet worth ten minas. The preciousness of the gifts and the pouring of libations at the feast meant that this ceremony was also a ritual of deifying either the king himself or the institution of royalty, and Thucydides was likely referring to this custom when he wrote that noting could be accomplished among the Odrysians without gift-giving.

Gift-giving was an important social ritual in ancient Thrace, and among the Odrysians, vessels bearing the king's name in the genitive case, the name of the king's court artist in the nominative case, and the name of the settlement from where it originated were offered to the king at the city gates as a mythical investiture rite. Later, during a feast at the royal residence, the king would offer some of these phialae and rhytons to his important guests, which included local rulers from the Triballi, Getae, and Moesi tribes, as pledges of friendship, but also as an act of investiture whereby the Odrysians king would stand as a substitute for the Hero  by putting his name on the royal insignia and then presenting them to the Triballi and Getae rulers. Achaemenid Persian kings also sent precious vessels as signs of special favour to their satraps and commanders, and the Odrysians custom might have been borrowed from the Persians, as attested by the fact that the Persians had themselves also offered to a local Thracian cheftain an amphora-rhyton and a silver jug, which were discovered in the Koukova Mogila near Douvanli.

Coinage
Under the reign of Cotys I, Odrysian coins started being stamped with the image of a galloping horseman; although this image had already been known to the Thracians from earlier times, Cotys adopted the practice of depicting it on coins from the Achaemenid Empire - that Cotys had sought inspiration from Achaemenid practices is visible in how his coins were also stamped with the likeness of the Persian satrap Tissaphernes. Other coins of Cotys were stamped with a boar's head, copied from earlier Lydian coins. The images of the horseman and the boar's head on the coin represented the royal test of valour and the protection of life.

The Odrysian kings Amadocus II and Teres I stamped the image of the "Dionysian"  on their coins due to the god's role as a deity of kingship.

The soul
Thracian religion conceptualised the soul as being immortal, and held it as more important than the body. The Thracians believed that the souls of the dead either returned to the world of the living or instead attained a greater form of happiness than they did during their mortal lives.

Healing
Ancient Thracian healers were renowned in the ancient world.

The Thracian healers believed that everything good or bad for the body was derived from the soul, and therefore the soul had to be healed first for the body to then be cured, which was itself based on the Thracian conceptualisation of the soul as more important than the body. The healing was done with the help of chanting which consisted of good talk that brought wisdom to the soul, and therefore the soul's acquisition of wisdom made being healthy easy.

Death
Due to their belief that death was the threshold to a blissful afterlife, ancient Thracians would calmly and willingly accept death.

Suicide
All the Thracians held the act of killing oneself in respect because of the belief in the soul's immortality and in death as a transition to this state of immortality.

Funerary customs

Since Thracian society was highly patriarchal and Thracian men were polygamous, whenever a Thracian man died, his wives would compete to decide which one among them was most beloved by their husband, and the deceased's friends pleaded on each wife's behalf. Once a conclusion had been reached concerning which wife was the most beloved one, she was slain over the grave of her husband by her kinsmen and buried with him, while being one of the survivors of this funerary competition was considered to be a disgrace.

Heroic burials
The graves of Thracian mythical heroes were places of worship around which shrines were built, and where prayers were offered to the heroes and protectors and miracles were held to occur.

The burial mound of Orpheus therefore was a shrine where sacrifices and other rituals in honour of the god were performed. According to one account by Pausanias, a shepherd once fell asleep while leaning on Orpheus's shrine, and during his sleep he started singing the songs of Orpheus while nightingales sang on his grave.

The grave of Resus was also the site of a shrine where miracles were believed to occur, such as when boars, deers, and other mountain animals walked in twos and threes to willingly offer themselves to sacrifice at his heroum. This resting place of Rhesus was located on the thickly populated Rhodope Mountains, and there were many settlements around the shrine itself.

Royal burials
When a Thracian king died, his body laid in state for three days during which animal sacrifices were performed and funerary feasts were held and the deceased was mourned, after which he was either cremated and his ashes buried or his body was interred. Thracian kings were usually buried with two spears in their graves (a custom derived from the Indo-European concept of "two sets of weapons" owned by the king, where he inherited one of the spears from his father, and gained the other through his own valorous deeds. They were also buried with phialae used for the mystery cults to be used in the afterlife. Finally, the king's most beloved wife was sacrificed on his grave so she would join him in the afterlife. A tumulus mound was then raised over the burial site and games were held, with the greatest prize set aside for single combat.

The sacrifice of the favourite wife in the king's case symbolised the concept of the king's death as being his marriage to the princess Earth, and therefore marriage scenes were painted in Thracian tombs (such as in Kazanluk and Sveshtari) as a symbol of death, referring to an ancient identification between marriage and death in Thracian religion. His other wives would be given to his friends who would leave wedding gifts on the tomb or challenged the dead king to a duel. The mural of the Kazanluk tomb is also a depiction of the ritual divine marriage, in which the deceased chieftain, having already been deified and become an anthropodaemon, is seated at a table with food on it and holds a phiale in one hand while his other hand is tenderly placed under that of his wife, who is seated on a throne next to him. The chieftain's gesture is similar to that of Zeus drawing Hera to him from a metope from Selinus, and represents the royal rank of the chieftain which he acquired by his union with his deified wife who has been assimilated with the goddess  in the presence of the Snake-Goddess foremother. The phiale he holds in his hand was a symbol of investiture, and which therefore linked the hierogamy with the royal investiture.

The veneration of the king's burial site continued after the funeral, sacrifices were offered near the tumuli on festival days. therefore, the builders made the tombs as accessible as possible, such as a pyramidal Thracian tomb near the village of Tatul where steps were carved into the rock so worshippers could climb to the top and pay homage to the members of the royal family buried there, and the Odrysian burial complex in the Eastern Rhodope Mountains below the Thracian fortress on Mount Saint Marina, where a staircase cut into the rock led straight to the tomb of the deified chieftain which was located at a considerable height. The many Thracian tombs were always built in high locations so they would face the Sun all day, hence uniting the chthonian and solar cults within themselves, and thus embodying the oneness of the king and the Hero .

Statues of the dead rulers were erected atop their tumuli, and a group of sculptures representing the Hero 's boar hunt were placed at the entrance of the Thracian tomb of Mezek.

Reincarnation
Thracian ascetic sects who were initiated in the rites of the mystery cult, such as the Ctistae and Capnobatae, lived peaceful celibate lives without women, abstained from eating any living being, not even the animals in their flocks, and were vegetarians who subsisted only on honey, milk and cheese, because they believed in the transmigration of souls.

Afterlife
The Thracians did not believe in a discrete separation between the world of the living and the afterlife, as attested by how the Scaeii and the Cebrenii believed the threat of their king-priest Cosingas that he would climb a ladder to heaven to complain to "Hera" about them.

Thracian religion conceptualised the soul as being immortal, unlike the Greek version of the afterlife whereby the souls of the dead became pale shadows in the underworld. Instead, the Thracians believed that the souls of the dead either returned to the world of the living or instead attained a greater form of happiness than they did during their mortal lives.

Deceased kings were believed to become anthropodaemons after their death, hence why the Odrysian dynasty's founder Teres I quickly became assimilated to the hero Tereus mere decades after his death, and a paean was sung in honour of the hero , to whom the king Sitalces was assimilated, just like there was a song and dance of : once a Thracian ruler had died, he was believed to have become one with and indistinguishable from the Hero .

Orpheus/ had promised the Thracians a paradise where they would join him instead of dying,

Similarly to Iranian mystery cults, where Yima took only the souls of the good to Paradise, Orpheus/ was believed to welcome only good souls but not bad souls, that is he welcomed only those who had learnt the secret of immortality through initiation in the mysteries, but not the uninitiated who had not gained this privilege. Therefore, the Thracians believed immortality of the soul could be attained only by a select few initiates of the mystery cult of Orpheus/, who would rise in body and spirit to join Orpheus/ and remain with him eternally, thus each becoming an anthropodaemon and a new hero. This belief was described by Herodotus by the Greek term , meaning "to make immortal".

Therefore, the dead in the present were believed to rise in body and spirit and acquire immortality and thus become heroes. Since the Thracians did not perceive the world in terms of linear time, and therefore conceptualised their religion and myths not as histories of ancient pasts, but as occurring in the present, and there was no difference between the mythical and heroic past and the present in Thracian religion, the various divine, semi-divine, and human heroes of Thracian religion were believed to still be performing their valorous deeds in the present on another plane of existence in heaven which was not necessarily separate from the world of the living necessarily in an abrupt way.

History
When the Romans conquered Thrace in the 1st century CE, they destroyed the Thracians' traditional political and administrative systems, which in turn stripped Thracian religion of its social base, and when the Bessi were defeated by the Roman commander Lucius Calpurnius Piso Caesoninus in 13 CE, he celebrated his victory by "chaining [the Bessi's] Ares".

The Hero  became very popular in Thrace under Roman rule, when he was represented on thousands of votive tablets and worshipped in hundreds of shrines. Roman rule introduced the use of the images of Cybele, Mithras, and Silvanus, and votive reliefs on which were depicted Graeco-Roman deities including but not limited to Zeus, Hera, Athena, Asclepius and Hygieia, and Dionysos became common. However, this syncretism was largely superficial and local Thracian beliefs and concepts remained entrenched, as attested by the popularity of the Thracian mounted hero deity. When the Roman Empire started employing Thracians in its army, these soldiers during their deployments spread the cult of the Thracian horseman deity until as far as Britannia, Germania, Italy, the Tauric Chersonese, Asia Minor and Aegyptus.

The Thracian religion finally became extinct after Christianity was made the state religion of the Roman Empire. Because Thrace was close to the imperial capital of Constantinople, the Thracian worship of pagan deities, their sanctuaries and festivals became easy targets of the Roman authorities. The Thracian sanctuaries were demolished or burnt down, religious votive reliefs were destroyed, and the idols of the gods were thrown into pits to convert the Thracians to Christianity.

Legacy
The religion of the Scythians was influenced by that of the Thracians after the Scythians imposed their rule on settled Thracian populations living to the north of the Black Sea when they first arrived in the region of the Pontic Steppe. Thracian fertility cults, in particular, were absorbed by the Scythian religion, and the Scythian Great Goddess, Artimpasa, who like  was a mistress of animals and a power-giver, had been influenced by the Thracian Great Goddess.

The Eleusinian Mysteries celebrated in Greece were a religious importation from Thrace, and according to Greek sources, their founder was a Thracian named Eumolpus.

Around the late 6th century BCE, the Greek philosophical and religious movement known as Orphism arose out of a transformation of the Thracian religion. Orphism was a philosophical and religious movement within Greek intellectual and literary circles, spanning from the 6th century BCE to the 6th century CE, and philosophers influenced by Orphism ranged from Pythagoras to Plato and the Neoplatonists, throughout which its cosmogony, theogony and ethics remained distinct from the native Greek Olympian ones. However, Greek Orphism also existed as a religious sect which especially emphasised divination. The concept of the transmigration of the soul, especially, was inherited by Greek Orphism and Pythagoreanism from Thracian Orphism.

In Greece, at the sanctuary of Apollo in Delphi, which was connected to Thrace through a sacred road, the most important priestly family was the Thracides, and in the beginning in the 5th century BCE and under Thracian religious influence, a fusion of Apollo and Dionysys took place at Delphi, according to which it was believed Apollo departed to Hyperborea during winter, and in the meantime Dionysus became the lord of the sanctuary. Moreover, the ancient Greeks believed that the mythical Hyperboreans sent offerings to Apollo's sanctuary at Delos which passed through Thrace to reach the god's sanctuary.

The Greeks living in the colonies in Thrace themselves in turn would borrow these hybrid Thracian-Greek gods, such as the citizens of Ainos, who worshipped Hermes because the local Thracians worshipped a local form of Hermes-.

In the rest of Greece as well, Apollo and Dionysus were closely associated due to influence from Thracian Orphism, and Graeco-Roman authors recorded connections between the Thracian cult of the solar  and the Greek cult of Apollo.

The cult of the Thracian goddess  was adopted by the Greek city-state of Athens in 429 BCE. The goddess was honoured during the festivities of the Bendideia, which were celebrated in the city on the 19th and 20th days of the month of Thargelion.

The spread of the worship of the solar /Sabazios spread among the Graeco-Romans, who represented him under the traits of the Greek supreme god Zeus until the 3rd century CE. Under Roman rule, Sabazios was primarily worshipped in the eastern provinces of the Roman Empire, but was introduced in the western provinces by the Roman army.

The Greek myth of the Golden Fleece might have had its origin in the Thracian myth of the golden fleece.

The legendary  snake inhabiting the islands of Aegean Thrace mentioned by the Greek poet and physician Nicander of Colophon in his poem Theriaca might have been inspired by the Thracian Chaos-dragon.

According to Balkans folklore, dragons with legs are believed to be the most dangerous type of dragons, and some dragons are depicted as spotted snakes with bird heads, which might be motifs originating in depictions of the ancient Thracian Chaos-dragon.

Elements of the cult of the solar  have survived in the folklore of the populations living on both sides of the Bosporus, and some of the cult's components are still present in some customs from Bulgaria and northern Greece.

Bulgarian folklore's legend of the most dangerous of all wolves, the lame wolf , might have its origins in the lupine, asymmetrical, and outcast warrior-hero of the ancient Thracian religion.

Carnivals in southern Europe use many masks combining human and equine features. This motif originated in the image of the dual-natured centaur as a symbol of Chaos.

See also

 Albanian mythology
 Illyrian mythology
 Paleo-Balkan mythology

Notes

References

 

 
Thracian
Religion in classical antiquity
Paleo-Balkan mythology